= Felix Sumarokov-Elston =

Russian general (1820–1877)

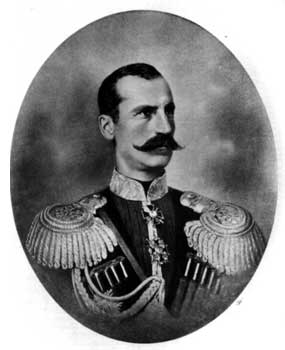
Count Felix Sumarokov-Elston

Count Felix Nikolayevich Sumarokov-Elston (Russian: Феликс Николаевич Сумароков-Эльстон; né Elston; 24 January 1820 – 30 October 1877) was a Russian military officer who served as the ataman of the Kuban Cossacks and the governor of Kuban Oblast in the late 1860s.

== Parentage ==
Named Felix at birth (a common name for illegitimate children), he was brought up by Princess Elisabeth Khitrovo, a famous salon hostess who was a daughter of Prince Mikhail Illarionovich Kutuzov and the mother of Countess Dorothea de Ficquelmont. It has been widely rumored that Felix Elston was the natural son of Khitrovo's eldest daughter, Countess Ekaterina von Tiesenhausen (a lady-in-waiting to King Frederick William IV of Prussia's sister, Empress Alexandra of Russia), and Prince Augustus of Prussia.

It appears more likely that Felix's parents were Carl Alexander Anselm Freiherr von Hügel (Regensburg, April 25, 1795 – Brussels, June 2, 1870) – the son of Johann Aloys Josef Hügel, later 1st Freiherr von Hügel (Koblenz, November 14, 1753 – Regensburg, 1826) and his wife Anna von Holthof (married in 1787) – and Countess Jozefa Andrássy de Csíkszentkirály et Krasznahorka (Košice (Kassa), April 8, 1790 – 1868), a relative of Gyula Andrássy. She was married (in Košice (Kassa), February 7, 1808) to Miklós Graf Forgách de Ghymes et Gács (1784 – Nagyszalánc (Slanec), January 10, 1857), by whom she had three sons, all of whom died unmarried and without any issue.

Recent investigations undertaken by one of his great-granddaughters and an English genealogist practically confirm this late ancestry, not explaining, however, the motives why he didn't use his father's name but used Elston, his English nanny's surname.

== Career ==
He was prominent during the siege of Sevastopol and was promoted to colonel in 1855. After his marriage in 1853 with the heiress of Count Sergei Sumarokov, he received the title of Count Sumarokov-Elston. By Imperial Decree of September 8, 1859, he was authorized to use the hereditary title of his father-in-law, with the condition of using his surname.

From 23 August 1863 to 3 February 1869, Sumarokov-Elston was an ataman of the Kuban Cossacks and from 1865 he was a governor of Kuban. During his military service, Sumarokov-Elston received numerous awards, including the Order of St. Vladimir of 1st degree, the Order of St. Stanislav of 1st degree, the Order of St. Anna of 1st degree with crown and others.

After 1868, he left military service because of poor health and lived abroad. He was a Russian representative at the wedding of Prince Milan of Serbia to Russian noblewoman Natalia Keshko. In 1875, Sumarokov-Elston was attached to King Oscar II of Sweden during the latter's visitation of Russia. Also in 1875, Sumarokov-Elston was appointed as head of the Kharkov military district.

== Issue ==
From his marriage with Countess Elena Sergeievna Sumarokova (September 5, 1829 – April 15, 1901), daughter of Count Sergei Pavlovich Sumarokov (1791-1875) and his wife Marchesa Aleksandra Pavlovna Maruzzi (c. 1808–1857), he had seven children, including Count Felix Felixovich Sumarokov-Elston, later prince Yusupov, who was the father of Prince Felix Yusupov.

1. Count Sergei Felixovich Sumarokov-Elston (6 October 1853 – 8 May 1881), lieutenant in the army, died aged 27 from typhoid fever.
2. Count Paul Felixovich Sumarokov-Elston (8 July 1855 – 17 January 1938), married Alexandra Abaza (mistress to Grand Duke Nicholas) and had two daughters, Catherine (1881) and Zinaida (1886). Later married Nadezda Oznobishina.
3. Count Felix Felixovich Sumarokov-Elston (17 October 1856 – 10 June 1928), married the noble heiress Zinaida Yusupova and had two sons, Nicholas (1883) and Felix (1887).
4. Countess Elizabeth Felixovna Sumarokova-Elston (15 March 1858 – 6 March 1940), married the statesman Pyotr Lazarev and had two sons, Mikhail (1881) and Vladimir (1886), and a daughter, Irina (1890).
5. Count Gabriel Felixovich Sumarokov-Elston (1859 – 1879).
6. Count Nicholas Felixovich Sumarokov-Elston (1861 – 16 July 1908), married Sophia Koshula and had one daughter, Elena (1890), and two sons, Nicholas (1891) and Mikhail (1893).
7. Countess Alexandra Felixovna Sumarokova-Elston (13 July 1863 – 1 April 1936), married the revolutionary politician Yuri Milyutin.

Australian conductor Alexander Briger is his great-great-great-grandson. Felix' son Paul Sumarokov Elston (1855) → Zinaida Sumarokov Elston (1886)→ Zinaida Bashkirova (1908)→ Andrew Briger (1922)→ Alexander Briger (1969).

== Sources ==
- "À la découverte de leurs racines" - Joseph Valynseele et Denis Grando - L'Intermédiaire des Chercheurs et Curieux, Paris, 1988
