= Felix Yusupov =

Russian aristocrat (1887–1967)

Prince Felix Felixovich Yusupov
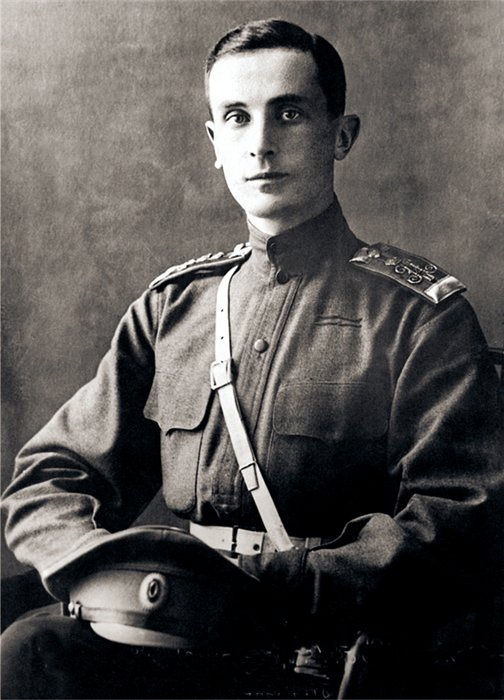
- Felix in 1914
- Born: 23 March [O.S. 11 March] 1887; Moika Palace, Saint Petersburg, Russian Empire
- Died: 27 September 1967 (aged 80); Paris, France
- Burial: Sainte-Geneviève-des-Bois Russian Cemetery
- Spouse: Princess Irina Alexandrovna of Russia (m. 1914)
- Issue: Countess Irina Felixovna Sheremeteva
Names
- Felix Felixovich Yusupov
- House: Yusupov
- Father: Count Felix Sumarokov-Elston
- Mother: Princess Zinaida Yusupova

Knyaz Felix Felixovich Yusupov, Count Sumarokov-Elston (Russian: Князь Фе́ликс Фе́ликсович Юсу́пов, Граф Сумаро́ков-Эльстон; 23 March [O.S. 11 March] 1887 – 27 September 1967) was a Russian aristocrat from the House of Yusupov who is best known for participating in the assassination of Grigori Rasputin and for marrying Princess Irina Alexandrovna, a niece of Emperor Nicholas II.

== Early life ==
He was born in the Moika Palace in Saint Petersburg, the capital of the Russian Empire. (Note: Felix was a direct descendant of sisters Anastasia Romanova, the wife of Prince Boris Mikhailovich Lykov-Obolenskiy, one of the Seven Boyars of 1610, and Marfa Romanova, the wife of Prince Boris Keybulatovich Tcherkasskiy. Anastasia and Marfa were the daughters of Nikita Romanovich (Russian: Никита Романович; born c. 1522 – 23 April 1586), also known as Nikita Romanovich Zakharyin-Yuriev, who was a prominent boyar of the Tsardom of Russia. His grandson Michael I (Tsar 1613–1645) founded the Romanov dynasty of Russian tsars. Anastasia and Marfa were the paternal aunts of Tsar Michael I and the paternal nieces of Tsaritsa Anastasia Romanovna Zakharyina-Yurieva.) His father was Count Felix Felixovich Sumarokov-Elston, the son of Count Felix Nikolaievich Sumarokov-Elston. Zinaida Yusupova, his mother, was the last of the Yusupov line, of Tatar origin, and very wealthy. For the Yusupov name not to die out, his father (1856, Saint Petersburg – 1928, Rome, Italy) was granted the title and the surname of his wife, Princess Zinaida Yusupova, on 11 June 1885, a year after their marriage, but effective after the death of his father-in-law in 1891. (Note: 1885 – on 11 June, by the most highly approved opinion of the State Council of the Guard, Lieutenant Count Felix Feliksovich Sumarokov-Elston was allowed to take the title and surname of his father-in-law, Chamberlain Prince Nikolai Borisovich Yusupov and be called Prince Yusupov Count Sumarokov-Elston so that the princely title and surname of the Yusupovs passed only to the eldest of his descendants.) (Note: It is well known that according to the laws of the Russian Empire when a princess married, she lost her title and assumed the title and surname of her husband. However, as we can see, a rare exception was made for them. Moreover, the Sovereign Emperor Alexander III issued on 2 December 1891, a letter of grant allowing the husband and wife to be called Princes Yusupov, Counts Sumarokov-Elston. Thus, he received the right for himself and his wife from December 1891 to be called Princes Yusupov, Counts Sumarokov-Elston, and in the future, the princely title and surname of the Yusupovs should be transferred only to the eldest male heir in the descending line and only after the death of the titleholder.)

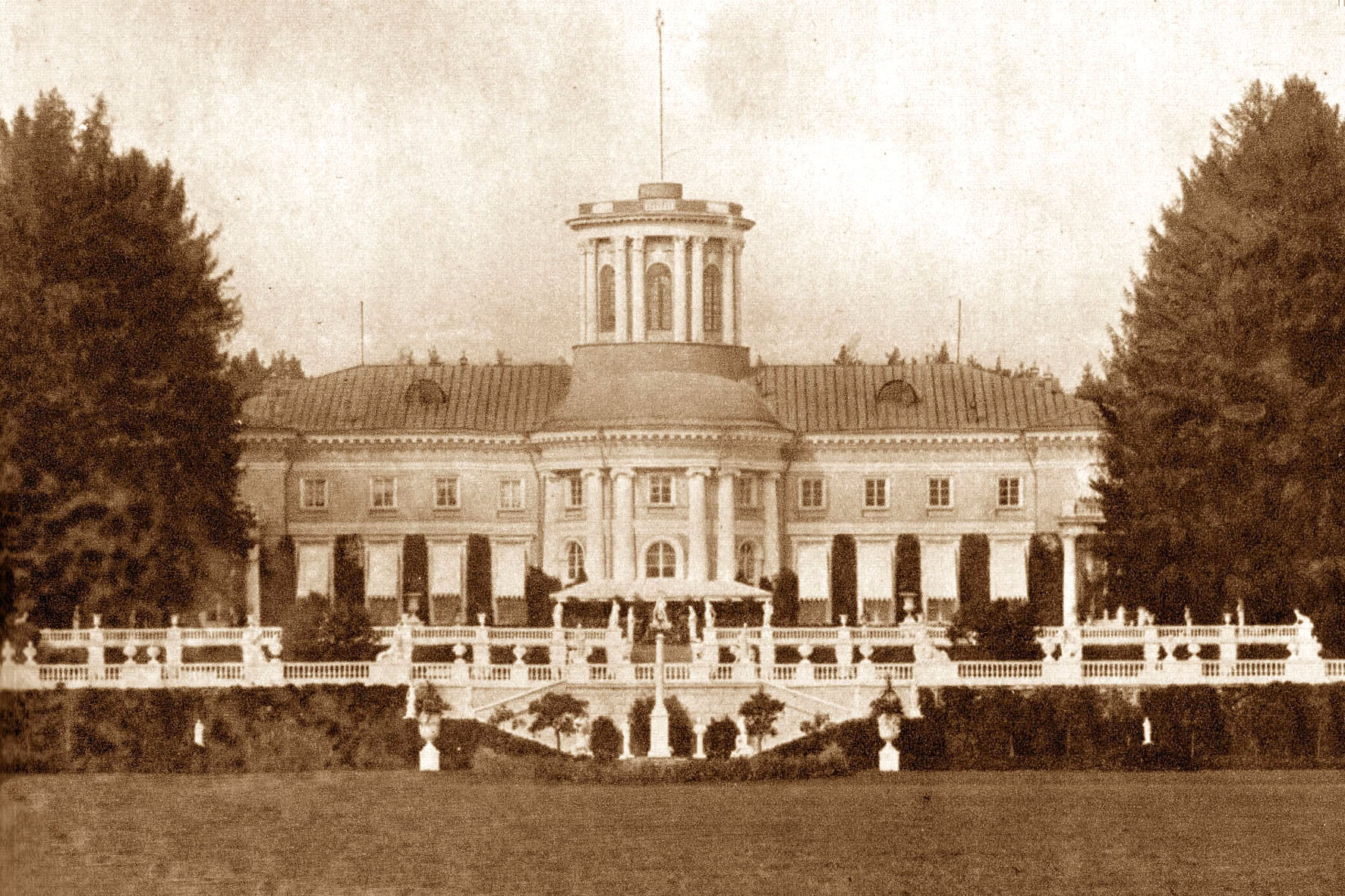
The family estate near Moscow; Arkhangelskoye Palace

The Yusupov family, one of the richest families in Imperial Russia, had acquired their wealth generations earlier. It included four palaces in Saint Petersburg, three palaces in Moscow, 37 estates in different parts of Russia, in the Crimea (at Koreiz, Kökköz and Balaklava), coal and iron-ore mines, plants and factories, flour mills and oil fields on the Caspian Sea. His father served between 1886 and 1904 as an adjutant to Grand Duke Sergei Alexandrovich the General-Governor of Moscow (with the support of Grand Duke Nikolas Nikolaevich). (Note: He was talkative, had no administrative experience and within a few months removed after (anti-German) riots. The city was declared under martial law.)

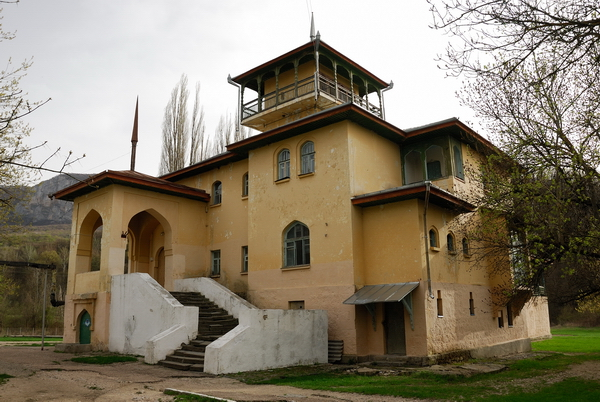
The hunting lodge at Sokolyne

Felix led a flamboyant life. As a young man, he cross-dressed habitually, beginning from birth to age five, and continuing on and off into adolescence. He later recalled crossdressing in his teen years to get into cabarets, which denied entrance to those in school uniforms. His brother's mistress Polya had helped him out by giving him her clothes which were a perfect fit. Dressed as a young woman, Yusupov gave six performances as a cabaret soprano, earning the acclaim of audiences, but on the seventh performance was discovered by friends who recognized him by means of his mother's jewelry, which he was wearing. Yusupov was upbraided by his family for this behavior, but the crossdressing did not stop. He continued dressing as a woman by night, while living as a student by day, even going so far on one occasion as to accept an invitation from a noted 'Don Juan' in the Guards, who, along with three other men, escorted Yusupov to a private dinner at the nightclub in St. Petersburg known as The Bear. There, the guardsmen made many advances on Yusupov habillé en femme, and the young prince was forced to smash a mirror with a bottle of champagne and shut off the lights in order to escape the men's attentions. From 1909 to 1913, he studied Forestry and later English at University College, Oxford, where he was a member of the Bullingdon Club, and established the Oxford Russian Club. Yusupov was living on 14 King Edward Street, had a Russian cook, a French driver, an English valet, and a housekeeper, and spent much of his time partying. He owned three horses, a macaw, and a bulldog called Punch. He smoked hashish, danced the tango, and became friendly with Luigi Franchetti, a piano player, and Jacques de Beistegui, who both moved in. At some time, Yusupov became acquainted with Albert Stopford and Oswald Rayner, a classmate. He rented an apartment in Curzon Street, Mayfair, and met several times with the ballerina Anna Pavlova, who lived in Hampstead.

== Marriage ==
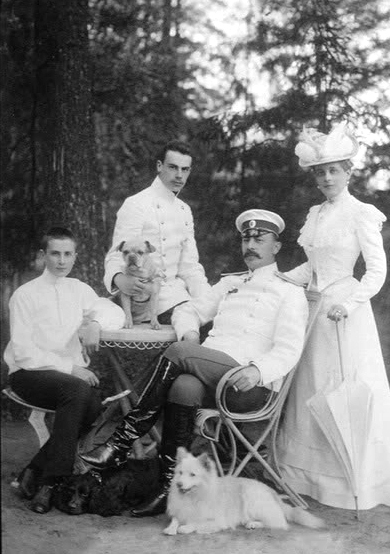
The Yusupov family in 1901: Prince Felix, Prince Nicholas, Count Felix Felixovich Sumarkov-Elston and Princess Zinaida

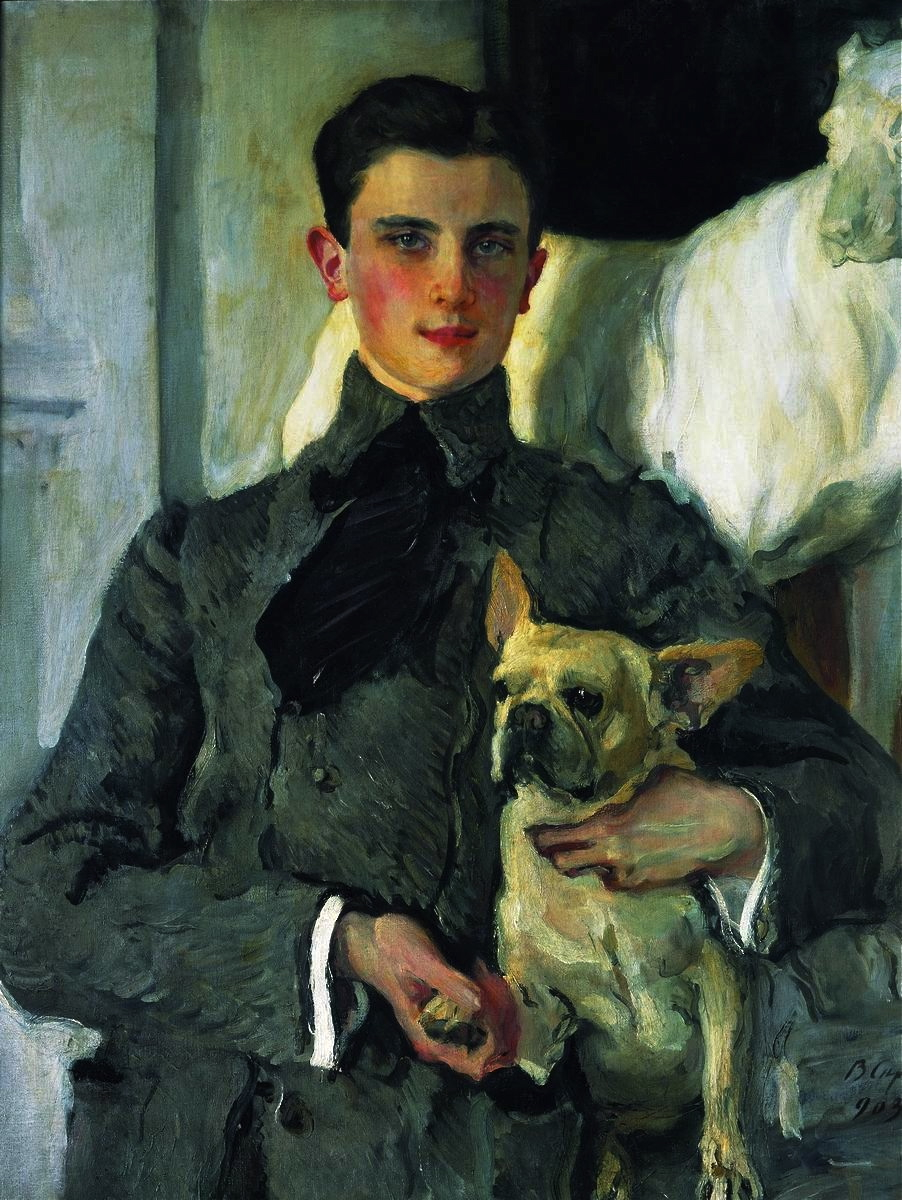
Portrait of Felix Yusupov (1903) by Valentin Serov

In 1913, Yusupov became engaged to Princess Irina of Russia, the emperor's only biological niece, in the Yusupov Palace in Koreiz. They were married in the Anichkov Palace in St. Petersburg on 22 February 1914, and the bride wore a veil that had belonged to Marie Antoinette. The Yusupovs went on honeymoon to the Crimea, Italy, Egypt, Jerusalem, London, and Bad Kissingen in Germany, where his parents were staying.

== World War I ==
When World War I broke out in August 1914, both he and his wife were briefly detained in Berlin. Irina asked her relative, Crown Princess Cecilie of Prussia, to intervene with Kaiser Wilhelm II. The Kaiser refused to permit the Yusupov family to leave but offered them a choice of three country estates to live in for the duration of the war. Felix's father appealed to the Spanish ambassador in Germany and won permission for them to return to Russia via neutral Denmark to the Grand Duchy of Finland and from there to Saint Petersburg.

The Yusupovs' only daughter, Princess Irina Felixovna Yusupova, nicknamed Bébé, was born on 21 March 1915. She was largely raised by her paternal grandparents until she was nine. Felix and Irina, raised mainly by nannies themselves, were ill-suited to take on the day-to-day burdens of child-rearing. Bébé adored her father but had a more distant relationship with her mother.

After the death of his brother Nicholas in a duel in 1908, Felix was the heir to an immense fortune. Consulting with family members about how best to administer the money and property, he decided to devote time and money to charitable activities and converted a wing/floor of the Liteyny House into a hospital for wounded soldiers.

Felix was able to avoid entering military service himself by taking advantage of a law exempting only sons from serving. Irina's first cousin, Grand Duchess Olga, to whom she had been close when they were children, was disdainful of Felix: "Felix is a 'downright civilian,' dressed all in brown, walked to and fro about the room, searching in some bookcases with magazines and virtually doing nothing; an utterly unpleasant impression he makes – a man idling in such times," Olga wrote to Nicholas on 5 March 1915 after paying a visit to the Yusupovs.

"Yusupov's plan, as he described it in his book, was to seek closer acquaintance with the healer Grigori Rasputin, and win his confidence. He asked Rasputin to cure a slight malady from which he suffered." These sessions stopped early January 1915 when, according to Maurice Paléologue, the most absurd stories were spread about Alexandra Feodorovna being the Starets' lover, Rasputin was also accused of espionage for Imperial Germany, and the tsarina was called nothing but "the German woman" (her birth nationality). The men did not meet again for almost two years. In February 1916, Felix began studies at the elite Page Corps military academy and tried joining an Imperial Russian Army regiment in August.

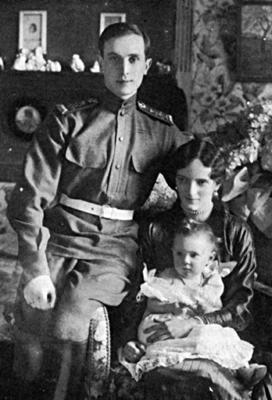
Felix and Irina with their daughter Irina Jr. in 1916

The heavy losses by the Russian military gave rise to rumors that Yusupov's family was involved in misprision of treason, according to Alexander Spiridovich:

Sunday, June 13, 1915: There were also stormy demonstrations at the gates of the Convent of Martha-and-Mary, the abbess of which is the Grand Duchess Elizabeth Feodorovna, the Empress's sister and widow of the Grand Duke Sergei. This charming woman, who spends her whole life in devotion and good works, has been smothered with insults, for the people of Moscow have long been convinced that she is a German spy …. All this news has caused the greatest consternation at Tsarskoye Selo. The Empress is violently attacking Prince Yusupov….

On 19 June 1915, after anti-German pogroms in Moscow, he was dismissed from the post of chief of the Moscow Military District, and on 3 September 1915 from the post of commander-in-chief over Moscow.

== Assassination of Grigori Rasputin ==
Early November 1916, Felix Yusupov approached the lawyer Vasily Maklakov for advice. Yusupov then asked Sergei Mikhailovich Sukhotin, a Preobrazhensky Regiment officer recovering from war injuries, who was also a friend of his mother. Grand Duke Dmitri welcomed Yusupov's suggestion as an indication that killing Rasputin would not be a demonstration against the Romanov dynasty. On 20 November, Felix visited Vladimir Purishkevich, who had delivered an angry anti-Rasputin speech in the Duma on the day before, and who quickly agreed to participate in the assassination.

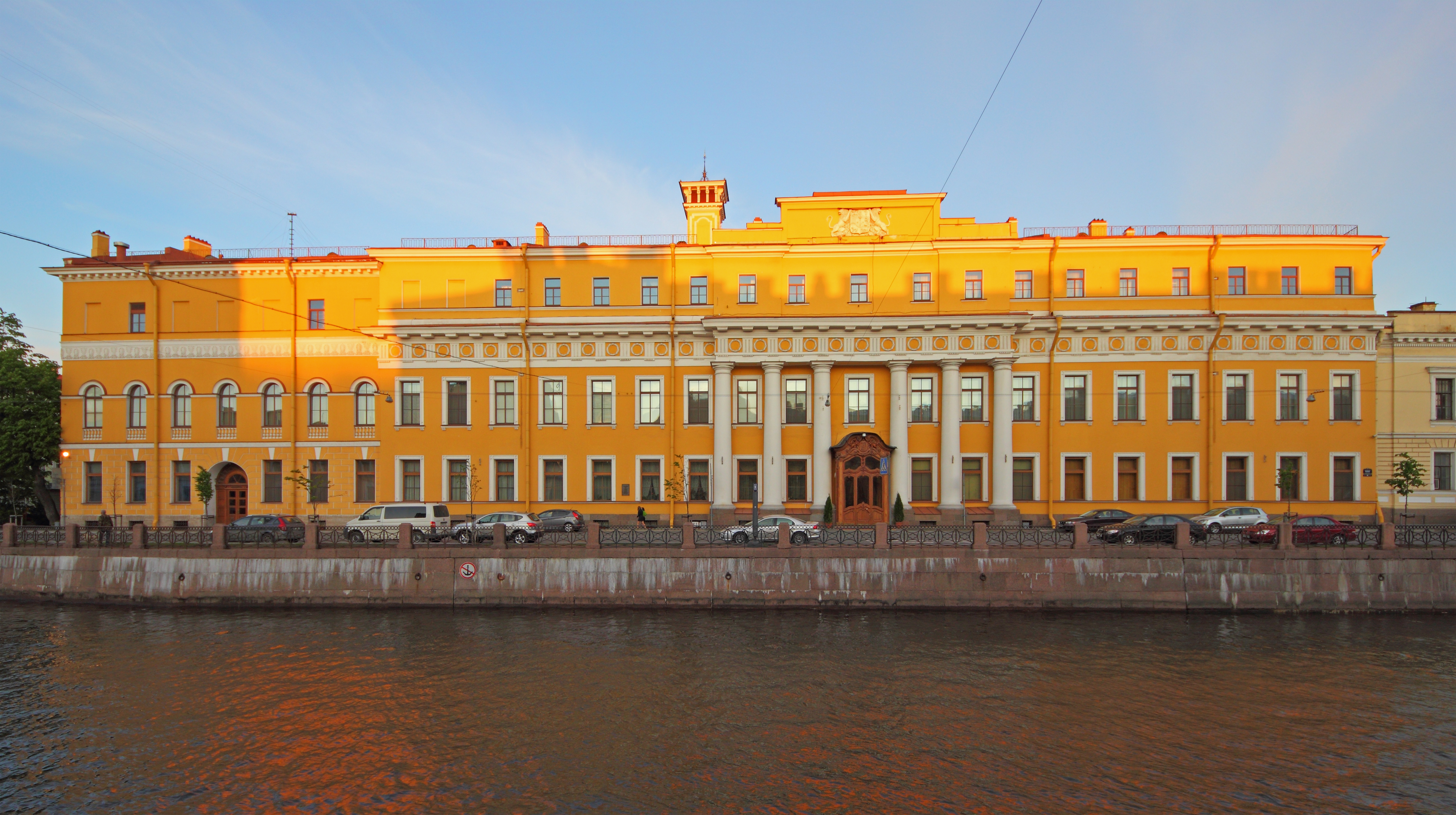
Yusupov's Palace in Saint Petersburg by Jean-Baptiste Vallin de la Mothe, bought in 1830 by Boris Yusupov

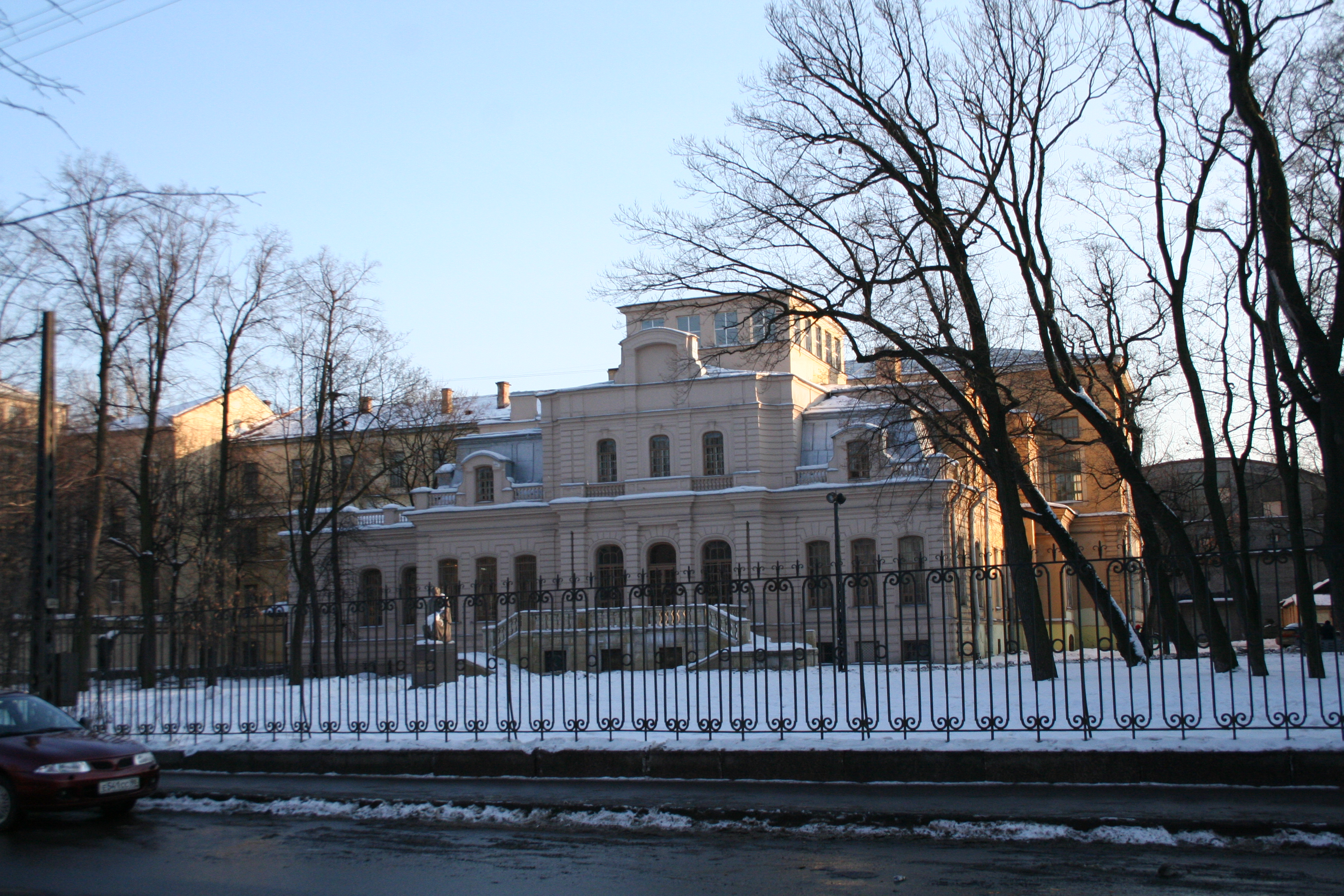
When the Yusupov Palace was renovated at the end of 1916, Felix lived in the palace of Grand Duchess Xenia Alexandrovna on Moika 106.

On the night of 29/30 December (NS) 1916, Felix, Dmitri, Vladimir Purishkevich, assistant Stanislas de Lazovert, and Sukhotin killed Rasputin in the Moika Palace under the pretense of a housewarming party. A major reconstruction of the palace had almost been finished, with a small room in the basement carefully furnished. Perhaps some women were invited but Yusupov did not mention their names; Radzinsky suggested Dimitri's step-sister Marianne Pistohlkors and film star Vera Karalli. Smith came up with Princess Olga Paley and Anna von Drenteln. Somewhere in the building were a major-domo and a valet, waiting for orders.

According to both Yusupov and Purishkevich, a gramophone in the study played interminably the Yankee Doodle when Rasputin came in. Yusupov mentions in his unreliable memoirs, that he then offered Rasputin tea and petit fours laced with a large amount of potassium cyanide. According to the diplomat, Maurice Paléologue—who in later years rewrote his diary—they discussed spirituality and occultism; the antique dealer Albert Stopford wrote that politics was the issue. After an hour or so, Rasputin was fairly drunk. Still waiting for Rasputin to collapse, Yusupov became anxious that Rasputin might live until the morning, leaving the conspirators no time to conceal his body. Yusupov went upstairs and came back with a revolver.

Rasputin was hit at close range by a bullet that entered his left chest and penetrated the stomach and the liver. The wounds were serious, and Rasputin should have died in 10–20 minutes, but he succeeded in escaping outside. A second bullet from a distance with a firearm lodged into his spine after penetrating the right kidney. Rasputin fell into the snow-clad courtyard and his body was taken inside. It is not clear whether or not Yusupov beat Rasputin with a sort of dumbbell. It is also not clear if it was Purishkevich who shot him point-blank into the forehead. A curious policeman on duty on the other side of the Moika had heard the shots, rang at the door, and was sent away. Half an hour later, another policeman arrived, and Purishkevich invited him into the palace. Purishkevich told him that he had shot Rasputin and asked him to keep it quiet for the sake of the tsar. The conspirators finally threw the corpse from Bolshoy Petrovsky Bridge into an ice hole in the Little Nevka.

On the empress's orders, a police investigation commenced and traces of blood were discovered on the steps to the back door of the Yusupov Palace. Prince Felix attempted to explain the blood with a story that one of his favorite dogs was shot accidentally by Grand Duke Dmitri. Yusupov and Dmitri were placed under house arrest in the Sergei Palace. The upper levels of the palace were occupied by the British embassy and the Anglo-Russian Hospital.

Empress Alexandra had refused to meet the two but said that they could explain what had happened in a letter to her. She wanted both shot immediately, but she was persuaded to back off from the idea. Without a trial, the tsar ordered the Grand Duke Dmitri to active service on the Persian front; Purishkevich was already on his way to the Romanian front. The last Tsar also sentenced Yusupov to house arrest upon his estate in Rakitnoye. Yusupov published several accounts of the night and the events surrounding the murder. Recent historians have cast considerable doubt, however, upon Prince Yusupov's account (see Grigori Rasputin).

According to Maklakov, Yusupov was not the mastermind. Fuhrmann thinks that Yusupov was the man who hatched the plot and who carried it out. "The clumsy way the assassination was carried out shows it was the work of an amateur." Fuhrmann also thinks Yusupov's "...candid Memoirs were corroborated by the other conspirators."

== Exile ==
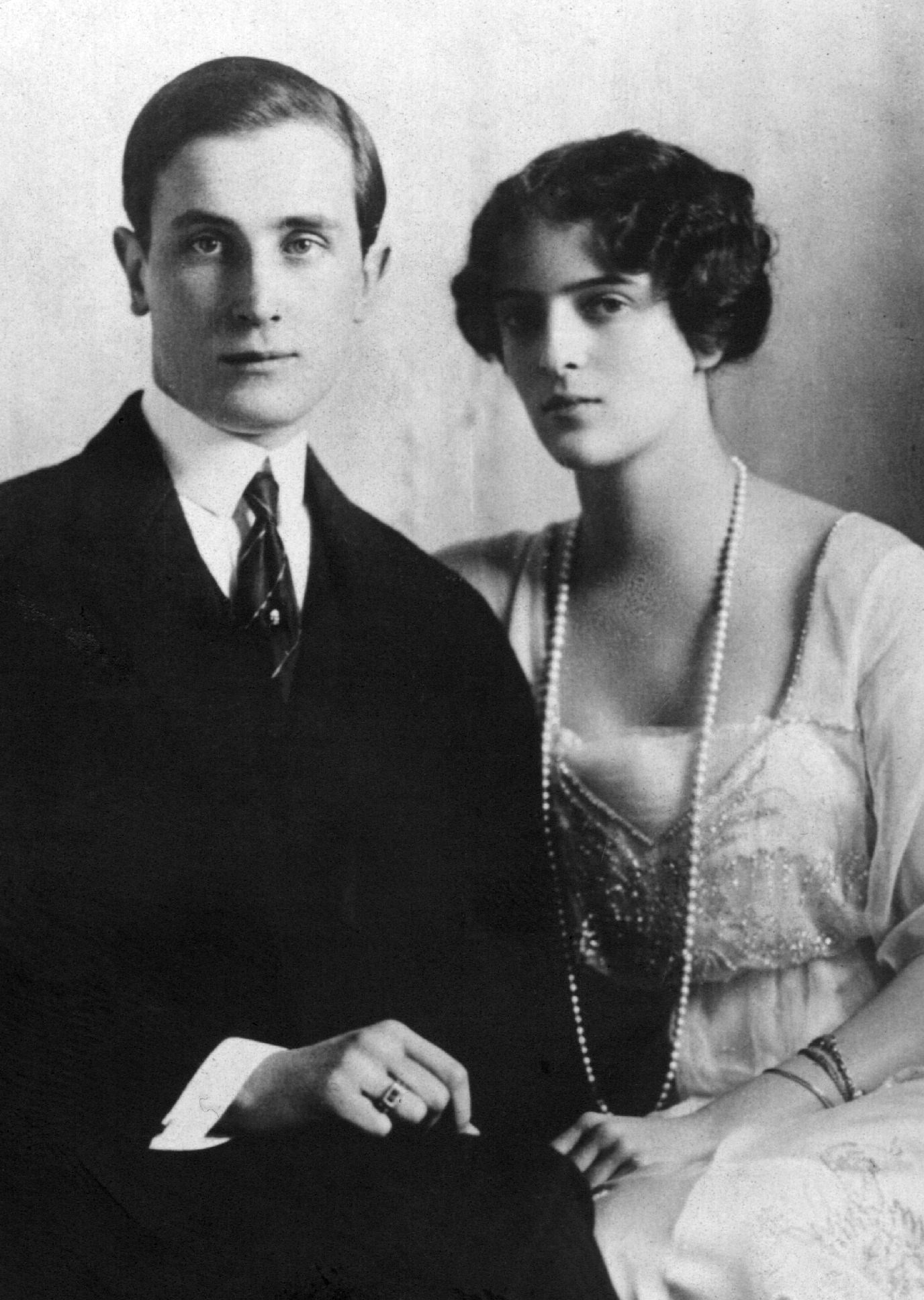
Prince Felix Yusupov and Princess Irina Alexandrovna in 1915

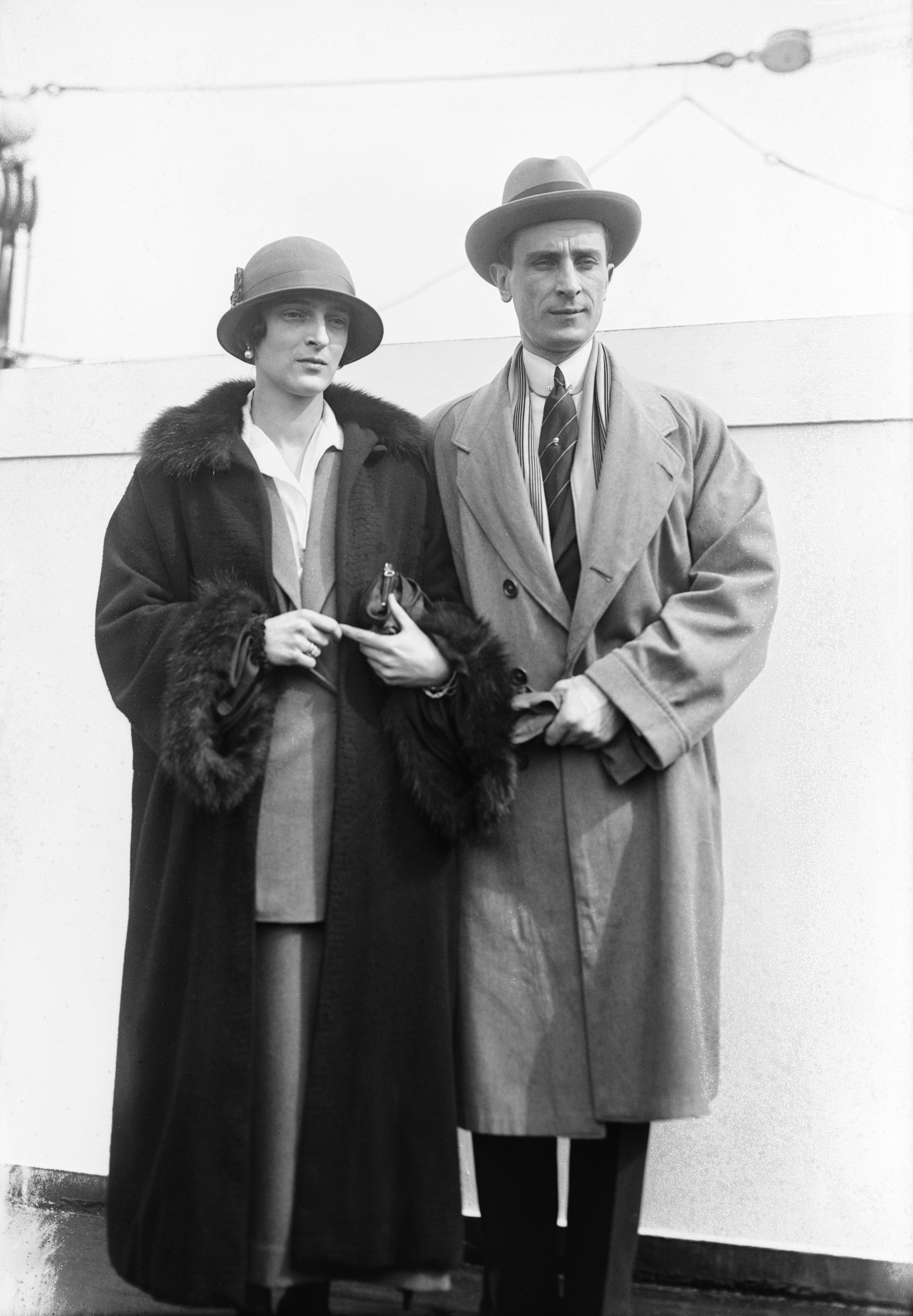
Yusupovs in exile 1930s

On 2 March, one week after the February Revolution, Nicholas abdicated the throne. Following the abdication, the Yusupovs returned to the Moika Palace before they went to Crimea. They later returned to the palace to retrieve jewels (including the blue Sultan of Morocco Diamond, the Polar Star Diamond, and the Marie Antoinette Diamond Earrings) and two paintings by Rembrandt, Portrait of a Gentleman with Tall Hat and Gloves and Portrait of a Lady with an Ostrich-Feather Fan. The sale proceeds of the paintings helped sustain the family in exile. The paintings were bought by Joseph E. Widener in 1921 and are now in the National Gallery in Washington, DC.

In Crimea, the family, along with other relatives (Irina's mother Xenia Alexandrovna, her grandmother Maria Feodorovna, her five uncles and their spouses, her grand-uncles Nicholas Nikolayevich Romanov and Peter Nikolaevich with their spouses and children) boarded a British warship, HMS Marlborough, which took them from Yalta to Malta. On the ship, Felix enjoyed boasting about the murder of Rasputin. One of the British officers noted that Irina "appeared shy and retiring at first, but it was only necessary to take a little notice of her pretty, small daughter to break through her reserve and discover that she was also very charming and spoke fluent English."

From Malta, they travelled to Italy and then to Paris. In Italy, lacking a visa, he bribed the officials with diamonds. In Paris, they stayed a few days in the Hôtel de Vendôme before they went on to London. In 1920, they returned to Paris.

The Yusupovs lived in the following places in France:

- 1920–1939: 37, Rue Gutenberg then 19 rue de La Tourelle in Boulogne-sur-Seine
- 1939–1940: they rented a mansion in rue Victor-Hugo, Sarcelles
- 1940–1943: they moved to rue Agar and 65 rue La Fontaine (16th arrondissement of Paris)
- from 1943 until their deaths: 38 rue Pierre-Guérin (Auteuil)

The Yusupovs founded a short-lived couture house, IRFĒ, named after the first two letters of their first names.

Irina modeled some of the dresses the pair and other designers at the firm created. Yusupov became renowned in the Russian émigré community for his financial generosity. Their philanthropy, their continued high living, and poor financial management extinguished what remained of the family fortune. Felix's bad business sense and the Wall Street crash of 1929 eventually forced the company to shut down. A new business under the same name was started by his granddaughter in Paris in 2008.

== Lawsuits ==
In 1932, he and his wife successfully sued American film company MGM, in the English courts, for libel and invasion of privacy in connection with the film Rasputin and the Empress. The alleged libel was not that the character based on Felix had committed murder but that the character based on Irina, called "Princess Natasha" in the film, was portrayed as having been seduced by the lecherous Rasputin. In 1934, the Yusupovs were awarded £25,000 damages, an enormous sum at the time, which was attributed to the successful arguments of their barrister, Patrick Hastings. The disclaimer that now appears at the end of many American films, "The preceding was a work of fiction, any similarity to a living person ...", first appeared as a result of the legal precedent set by the Yusupov case.

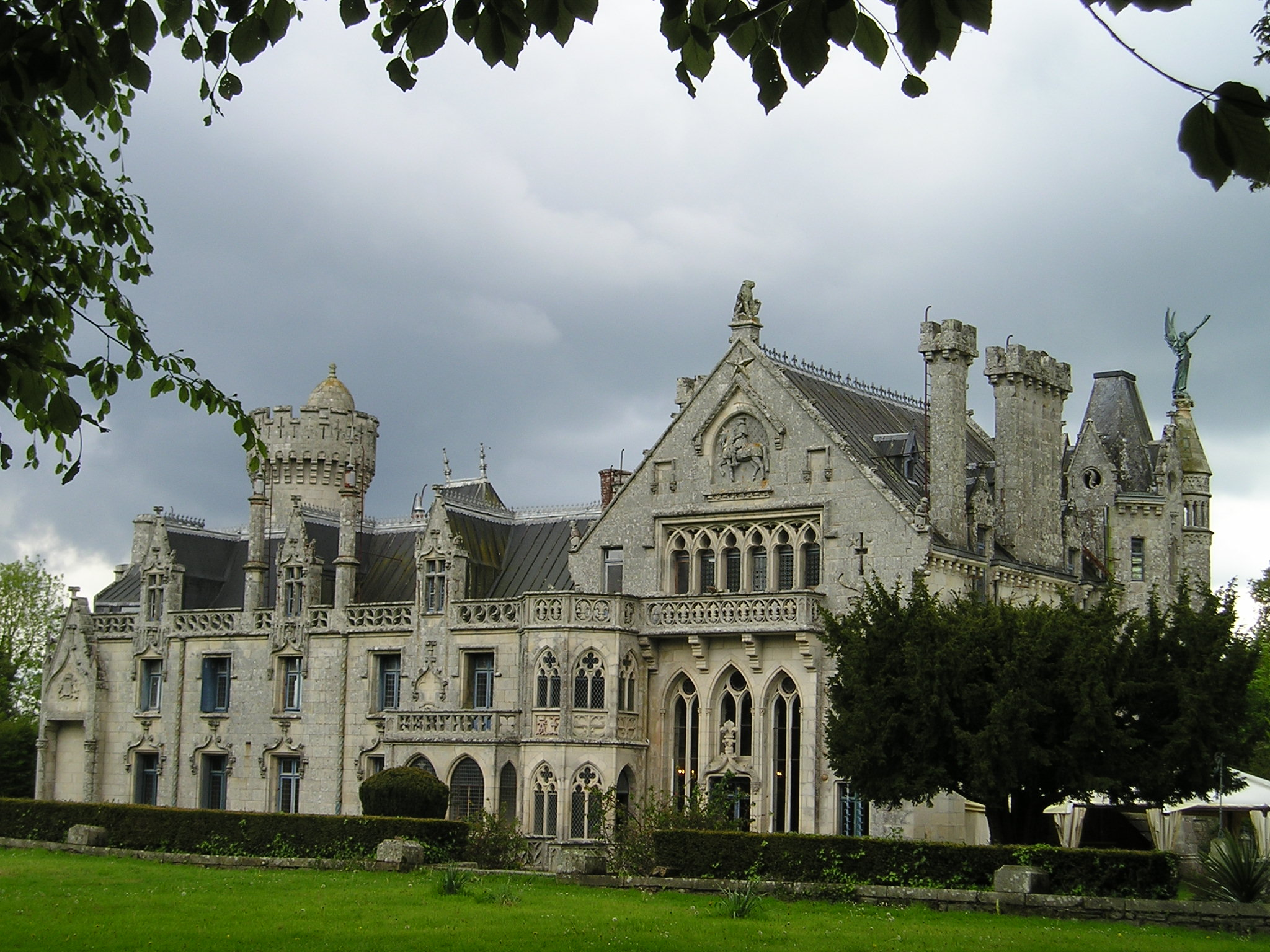
Château de Keriolet belonged to the Yusupov family

In 1965, Felix Yusupov also sued CBS in a New York court for televising a play based upon the Rasputin assassination. The claim was that some events were fictionalized, and under a New York state statute, his commercial rights in his story had been misappropriated. The last reported judicial opinion in the case was a ruling by New York's second-highest court that the case could not be resolved upon briefs and affidavits but must go to trial. According to an obituary of CBS's lawyer, Carleton G. Eldridge Jr., CBS eventually won the case.

In 1928, after Yusupov published his memoir detailing the killing of Rasputin, Rasputin's daughter, Maria, sued Yusupov and Dmitri in a Paris court for damages of $800,000. She condemned both men as murderers and said any decent person would be disgusted by the ferocity of Rasputin's killing. Maria's claim was dismissed. The French court ruled that it had no jurisdiction over a political killing that had occurred in Russia.

== Final years and death ==
Irina and Felix were married for more than 50 years. When Felix died in 1967, Irina was stricken by grief and she died three years later, on 26 February 1970. He was buried in Sainte-Geneviève-des-Bois Russian Cemetery, in the southern suburbs of Paris. Yusupov's private papers and several family artifacts and paintings are now owned by Victor Manuel Contreras, a Mexican sculptor who, as a young art student in the 1960s, met Yusupov and lived with the family for five years in Paris.

== In popular culture ==
Felix Yusupov has been depicted several times in various movies, television series, and other media.

Media featuring Felix Yusupov
Title	Year	Media	Portrayed by
The Fall of the Romanoffs	1917	Film	Conway Tearle
Rasputin, the Black Monk	1917	Film	Irving Cummings
Rasputin, the Holy Sinner	1928	Film	Jack Trevor
Rasputin, Demon with Women	1932	Film	Karl Ludwig Diehl
Rasputin	1954	Film	Jacques Berthier
The Night They Killed Rasputin	1960	Film	John Drew Barrymore
Rasputin	1966	TV miniseries	Dieter Ranspach
I Killed Rasputin	1967	Film	Peter McEnery/Himself
Nicholas and Alexandra	1971	Film	Martin Potter
Agony	1975/1981	Film	Aleksandr Romantsov
Rasputin: Dark Servant of Destiny	1996	Television film	James Frain
The Wages of Sin	1999	Novel	N/A
Rasputin	2003	Opera	Jyrki Anttila
Killing Rasputin	2003	Short film	Carlos Guitiérrez
Rasputin	2010	Film	Daniele Savoca
Raspoutine	2011	Film	Filipp Yankovskiy
Spring Breeze Snegurochka	2013–2014	Manga	N/A
Grigoriy R.	2014	TV miniseries	Vladimir Koshevoy
Rasputin, Vol. 1-2	2014–2016	Comic series	N/A
The Death of Rasputin	2016	Short film	Kyle Howard
The Legend of Rasputin	2017	Short film	Marty Stelnick
The King's Man	2021	Film	Aaron Vodovoz
Karamora	2022	TV series	Evgeny Schwartz

== Ancestors ==
Ancestors of Felix Yusupov

8. Charles von Hügel
4. Count Felix Nikolaievich Sumarokov-Elston
9. Countess Catherine von Tiesenhausen
2. Count Felix Felixovich Sumarokov-Elston
10. Count Sergei Pavlovich Sumarokov
5. Countess Elena Sergeievna Sumarokova
11. Marchioness Aleksandra Pavlovna Maruzzi
1. Prince Felix Felixovich Yusupov
12. Prince Boris Nikolaievich Yusupov
6. Prince Nikolai Borisovich Yusupov
13. Zenaida Ivanovna Narishkina
3. Princess Zenaida Nikolaievna Yusupova
14. Comte Alexandre de Ribeaupierre
7. Countess Tatiana Alexandrovna de Ribeaupierre
15. Ekaterina Mikhailovna Potemkina

== Descendants ==
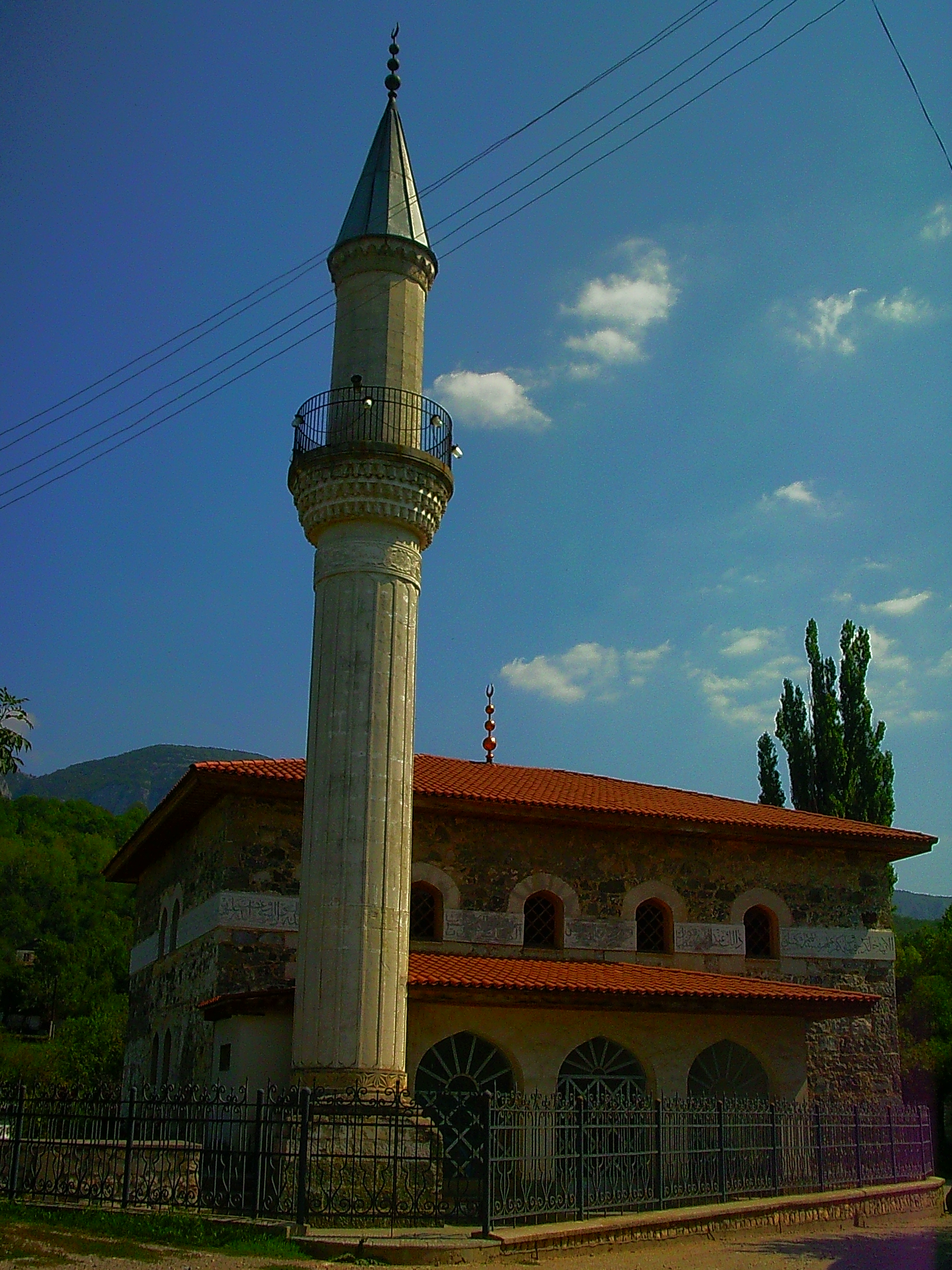
Felix commissioned Yusupov's Mosque.

Descendants of Felix and Irina are:

- Princess Irina Felixovna Yusupova, (21 March 1915, Saint Petersburg, Russia – 30 August 1983, Cormeilles-en-Parisis, France), married Count Nikolai Dmitrievich Sheremetev (28 October 1904, Moscow, Russia – 5 February 1979, Paris, France), son of Count Dmitry Sergeevich Sheremetev and wife Countess Irina Ilarionovna Vorontsova-Dashkova and a descendant of Boris Petrovich Sheremetev; had issue:
  - Countess Xenia Nikolaevna Sheremeteva (born 1 March 1942, Rome, Italy), married on 20 June 1965 in Athens, Greece, to Ilias Sfiris (born 20 August 1932, Athens, Greece); had issue:
    - Tatiana Sfiris (born 28 August 1968, Athens, Greece), married in May 1996 in Athens to Alexis Giannakoupoulos (born 1963), divorced, no issue; married Anthony Vamvakidis and has issue:
      - Marilia Vamvakidis (born 7 July 2004)
      - Yasmine Xenia Vamvakidis (born 17 May 2006)

== Works ==
- Youssoupoff, Félix (1927). La Fin de Raspoutine (in French). Paris: Librairie Plon. OCLC 422228302.
  - Youssoupoff, Felix (1927). Rasputin: his Malignant Influence and his Assassination. Translated by Rayner, Oswald. London: Jonathan Cape.
  - Youssoupoff, Felix (1927). Rasputin. Translated by MacVeagh, Lincoln. Dial Press. OCLC 1224674476.
- Youssoupoff, Félix (1952). Avant l'Exil: 1887–1919 (in French). Paris: Plon. OCLC 422228302.
  - Youssoupoff, Felix (1954). Lost Splendor. Translated by Green, Ann; Katkoff, Nicholas. New York: G. P. Putnam's Sons.
- Youssoupoff, Félix (1954). En Exil (in French). Paris: Plon. OCLC 7254183.

== Bibliography ==
- Ferrand, Jacques (1991). Les princes Youssoupoff & les comtes Soumarokoff-Elston: Chronique et photographies. Paris: Ferrand. OCLC 26077940.

== Sources ==
- Christopher Dobson (1989) Prince Felix Yusupov: The Man Who Murdered Rasputin. W. H. Allen. London.
- Fuhrmann, Joseph T. (2013). Rasputin. The Untold Story (illustrated ed.). Hoboken, New Jersey: John Wiley & Sons, Inc. p. 314. ISBN 978-1-118-17276-6.
- Greg King (1994) The Last Empress. The Life & Times of Alexandra Feodorovna, Tsarina of Russia. A Birch Lane Press Book.
- Margarita Nelipa (2010) The Murder of Grigorii Rasputin. A Conspiracy That Brought Down the Russian Empire, Gilbert's Books. ISBN 978-0-9865310-1-9.
- Bernard Pares (1939) The Fall of the Russian Monarchy. A Study of the Evidence. Jonathan Cape. London.
- Vladimir Pourichkevitch (1924) Comment j'ai tué Raspoutine. Pages de Journal. J. Povolozky & Cie. Paris.
