= Count Felix Sumarokov-Elston =

Russian nobleman (1856–1928)

- Count Sumarokov-Elston (1856 onward); Prince Yusupov (1882 onward)
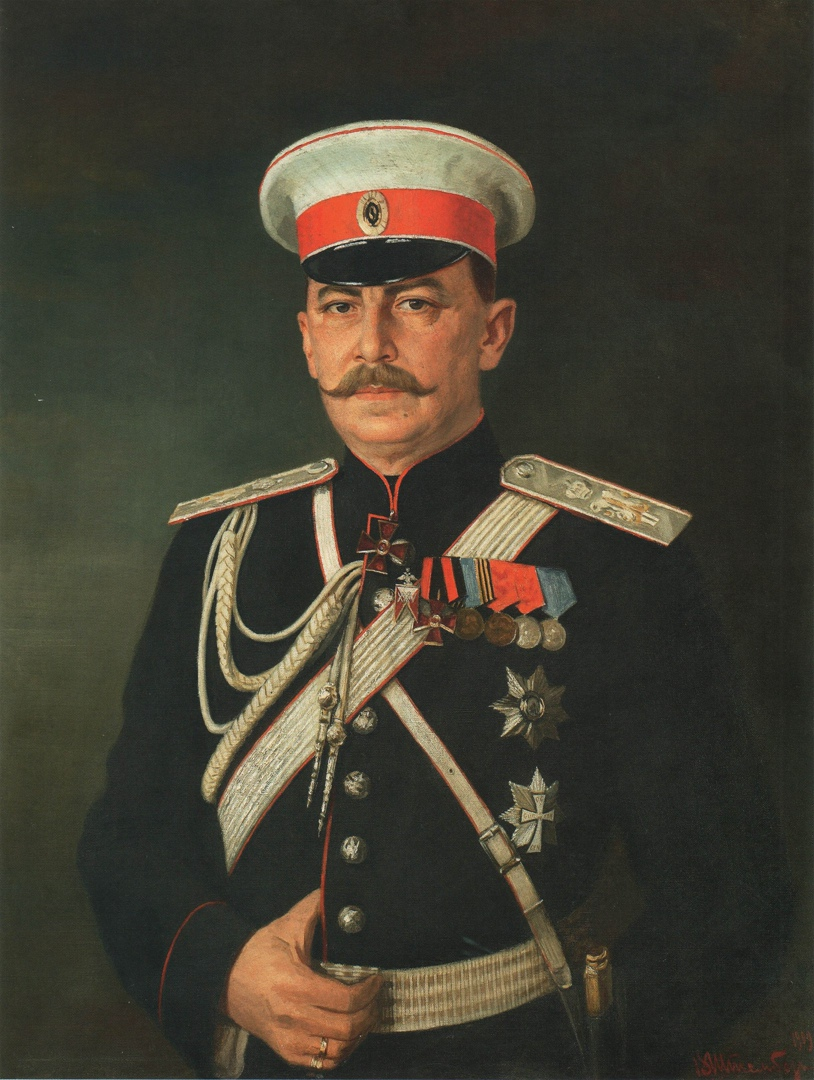
- Portrait in 1909
- Born: 17 October 1856; Saint Petersburg, Russia
- Died: 10 June 1928 (aged 71); Rome, Italy
- Buried: Protestant Cemetery, Rome
- Noble family: Yusupov (by marriage)
- Spouse: Zinaida Yusupova (m. 1882)
- Issue: Nicholas Yusupov; Felix Yusupov; Nicholas Elston (illegitimate son); Olivier Elston (illegitimate son); Tatiana Elston (illegitimate daughter)
- Father: Felix Sumarokov-Elston
- Mother: Elena Sergeievna Sumarokova

Count Felix Felixovich Sumarokov-Elston (Russian: Фе́ликс Фе́ликсович Сумаро́ков-Эльстон;17 October 1856 – 10 June 1928), later known as Prince Yusupov after his marriage in 1882, was a Russian nobleman, military officer and administrator. From 1915, he served as the governor-general of Moscow, a post previously held by Grand Duke Sergei Alexandrovich Romanov. He was the father of Nicholas and Felix Yusupov.

== Early life ==
Count Felix was born as the third of seven children to Count Felix Sumarokov-Elston (né Elston) and his wife, Countess Elena Sumarokova, and was named after his father. His godmother was Dolly de Ficquelmont. His father had been an illegitimate child of questionable birth. A popular theory, repeated by the family itself, was that the father of Felix Elston was Frederick William IV, King of Prussia. It was also claimed that the name "Elston" was derived from "elle s'étonne" (she is surprised), a supposed reaction of his birth mother.

Only a month before the birth of Count Felix, special permission had been obtained by Felix Elston to add his father-in-law's surname (Sumarokov) to his own, as his father-in-law had no sons. Count Felix was raised with his brothers Sergei (1853–1881) and Paul (1855–1938) in preparation for a military career. He studied at the Page Corps and passed his final exams in 1876. After serving in Odessa for three years, he was promoted to the Chevalier Guard Regiment.

== Marriage and issue ==
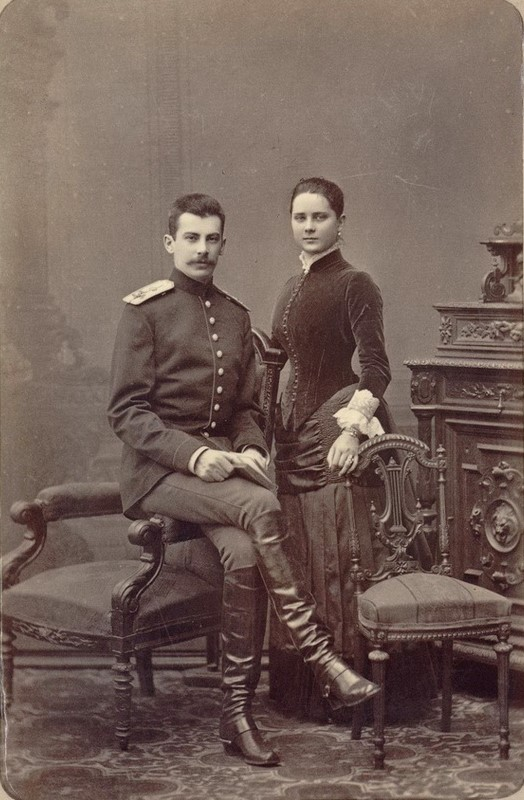
Count Felix and his wife Zinaida, shortly after their wedding

In 1882, Count Felix was present at a reception meant to introduce Prince Alexander of Battenberg to Russia's wealthiest and most eligible heiress, Zinaida Yusupova. Count Felix met Zinaida and fell in love. They married in Saint Petersburg on 4 April 1882, to the disappointment of Zinaida's father, who had hoped for a royal son-in-law.

Only ten months after the wedding, their son Nicholas was born. Two more sons died in infancy, followed by the birth of Felix in 1887. Like his father before him, Count Felix was granted the right to bear his wife's surname and title, and to bestow it upon their sons in addition to his own title.

The couple had over fifty estates and palaces but mostly lived at the Moika Palace, their Crimean Palace and Arkhangelskoye. He was ill-equipped to manage his wife's immense fortune and made many bad investments.

His younger son later wrote in his memoirs: "Our relations with our father were always very distant. They merely consisted of kissing his hand in the morning and evening. He knew nothing of life and neither my brother nor I ever talked frankly with him."

== Career ==
From 1883 to 1885, he worked at the Ministry of Internal Affairs. He subsequently was made adjutant to Grand Duke Sergei, a position he would hold for almost twenty years until the Grand Duke's assassination in 1905. That year, he was made a major general to Nicholas II. From 1908, he was left in charge of the Imperial Cavalry.

== Personal tragedies ==
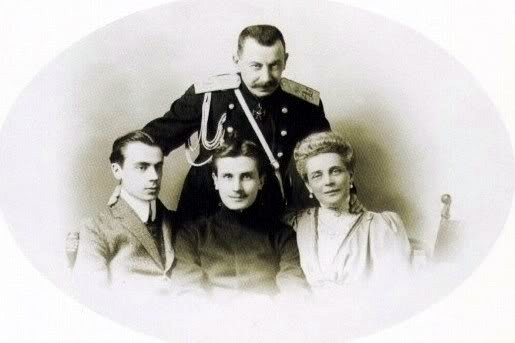
Prince Yusupov with his wife and their sons Nicholas and Felix

He disapproved of his eldest son Nicholas performing as an amateur actor and poet. Later, he was furious when he found out his younger son had performed in a café in drag. However, the bigger scandals were still to come. Nicholas fell in love with Countess Marina van Heiden and wished to marry her, but his parents disapproved on account of the girl's reputation and existing engagement. In 1908, Nicholas rekindled his affair with the now-married Marina. As a result, her husband, Count Manteuffel, challenged Nicholas to a duel and killed him. Nicholas was only twenty-five years old, and his parents were devastated.

In 1914, his remaining son Felix married Princess Irina Romanova, Nicholas II's only niece, despite the groom's scandalous reputation. Only two years later, his son murdered Grigori Rasputin and was banished from the capital. The disgrace affected the entire family, and Prince Yusupov had to retire from the army. He moved to his estate in Rakitnoye. While Zinaida Yusupova approved of her son's actions in murdering the starets, Prince Yusupov's feelings are unknown.

== Revolution ==
After the October Revolution in 1917, Prince Yusupov fled to the Crimea with his wife. They stayed there for over a year, until the HMS Marlborough evacuated Prince Yusupov, his wife, their son, their daughter-in-law Irina and their granddaughter, along with 39 other Romanov relatives, in April 1919. Prince Yusupov and his wife settled in Rome. He had a severe stroke in 1924 and died aged 71 in 1928.

== Second family ==
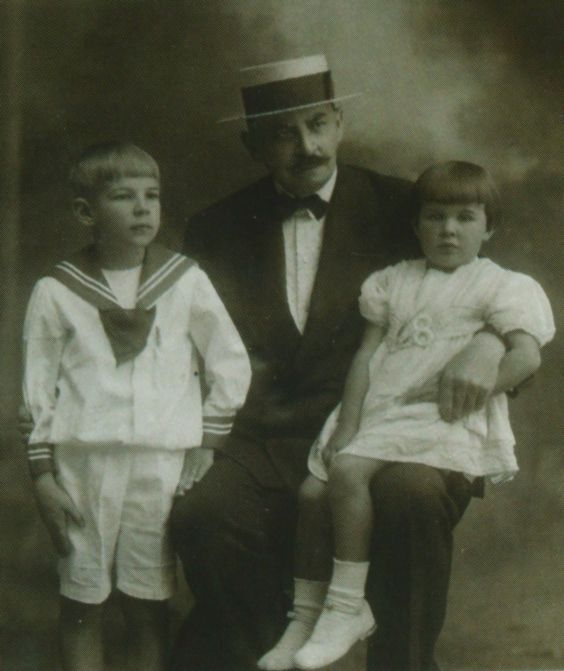
Prince Yusupov and his two youngest children

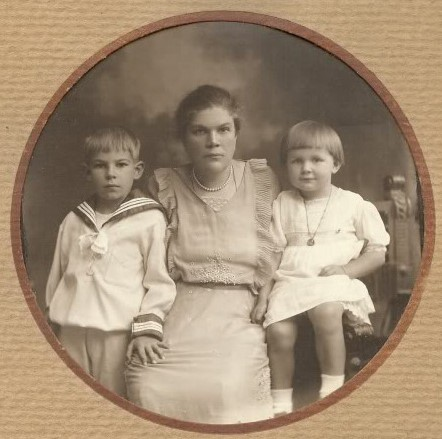
Zina, Prince Yusupov's mistress, and their two children in the early 1920s

In 2016, an auction of the possessions of Prince Yusupov's son Felix revealed the existence of his father's secret, second family. After the death of their son Nicholas in 1908, Prince Yusupov and his wife grew apart. Their surviving son wrote: "His nature was so different from my mother's that he never really understood her."

In 1910, Prince Yusupov began a romantic relationship with his goddaughter Zinaida Gregorievna (1880–1965), known as "Zina". She had been an attendant to his mother (Elena Sumarokova) until her death in 1901. On 6 October 1914, Zina gave birth to a son, Nicholas (named after his late elder half-brother), who tragically died after only ten months. On 2 June 1916, Zina gave birth to a second son, also in Saint-Petersburg, named Elefteriy (1916–2004). The unusual name was possibly chosen because of Pope Eleutherius, who was mentioned in the Felician Catalogue (sharing Prince Yusupov's first name). In any case, Elefteriy later changed his name to Olivier Elston.

After the Revolution, Zina accompanied Prince Yusupov to Alupka in Crimea, where she gave birth to a girl named Tatiana on 5 July 1919. Through forged documents, Prince Yusupov was able to get Zina and their two children to Rome in 1920. From the start of their relationship, Prince Yusupov had let Zina use the last name Svetilov, so she could pose as the wife of his private secretary. In Rome, Zina was told by Prince Yusupov to use specific routes when shopping for her children in order to avoid his wife. The family later moved to Venice, and then to France.
