= Nicholas Yusupov =

Russian aristocrat

Nicholas Felixovich Yusupov
- Prince Yusupov, Count Sumarokov-Elston
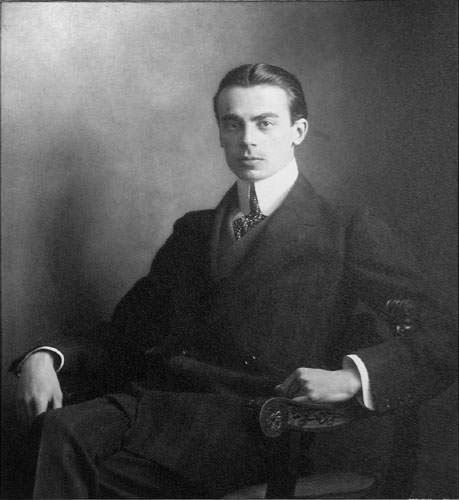
- Photograph of Nicholas Yusupov

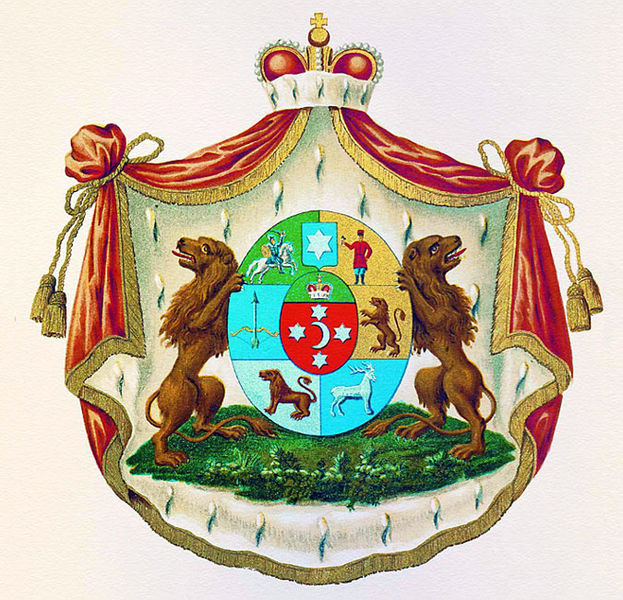
- Coat of arms
- Native name: Николай Фе́ликсович Юсу́пов
- Born: February 28, 1883; Saint Petersburg, Russian Empire
- Died: July 5, 1908 (aged 25); Saint Petersburg, Russian Empire
- Noble family: House of Yusupov
- Parents: Count Felix Sumarokov-Elston Princess Zinaida Yusupova

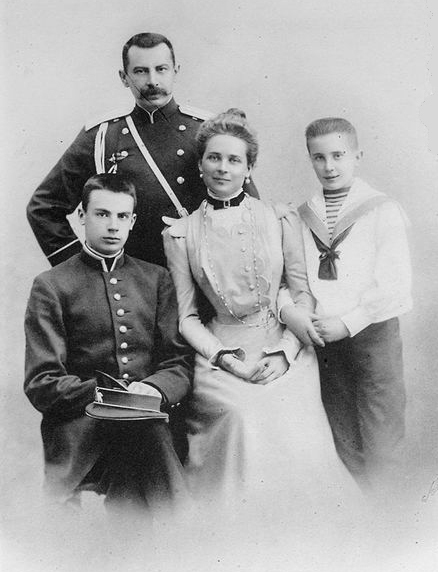
Prince Nicholas (left), with his parents and younger brother.

Prince Nicholas Felixovich Yusupov, Count Sumarokov-Elston (Russian: Князь Николай Фе́ликсович Юсу́пов, Граф Сумаро́ков-Эльстон; 28 February 1883 – 5 July 1908) was a Russian aristocrat from the House of Yusupov. He was the elder brother of Felix Yusupov, who was later known as the murderer of Grigori Rasputin.

== Biography ==
=== Early life ===
Prince Nicholas Felixovich Yusupov was born at the Moika Palace in Saint Petersburg in 1883 to Count Felix Sumarokov-Elston and Zinaida Yusupova, the wealthiest heiress in Russia, only ten months after their wedding. He was named after his maternal grandfather. His father had obtained special permission from Alexander III to use his wife's last name for himself and his children so that the Yusupov name would survive.

Nicholas was joined by three younger brothers, of whom only the youngest, Felix, would survive infancy. Prince Felix claimed in his memoirs that upon seeing him for the first time, five-year-old Nicholas exclaimed: "Disgusting! Throw him out the window!" Zinaida wrote in her diary that Nicholas said "that his baby brother looked like a monkey."

During his childhood, the family travelled around their forty-four estates in Saint Petersburg, Moscow and Crimea. Summers were always spent at Arkhangelskoye Palace, where Prince Nicholas would later be buried. The family travelled in a special private train.

=== University life ===
Prince Nicholas studied law at Saint Petersburg University, graduating in 1905. He was an amateur actor and writer. He was friends with the actor Vsevolod "Vova" Blumenthal-Tamarin and the prima ballerina Anna Pavlova. Using the nom-de-plum "Rokov", Nicholas also wrote romantic poems. With his first girlfriend Polya, he helped his younger brother perform as a cross-dressing singer in The Aquarium, a café in Saint Petersburg. Felix remembered:

"There was a gap of five years between my brother Nicholas and myself; this at first hampered our intimacy, but by the time I was sixteen we had become fast friends. Nicholas went to school and then to the University of St. Petersburg. He liked military life no better than I did and refused to become a soldier. However, his character differed from mine and resembled my father’s. From my mother, he inherited a gift of music, literature and the arts. At twenty-two he directed a company of amateur comedians who gave private performances. This greatly shocked my father, who always refused to allow him to act in our own theatre."

=== Romance ===
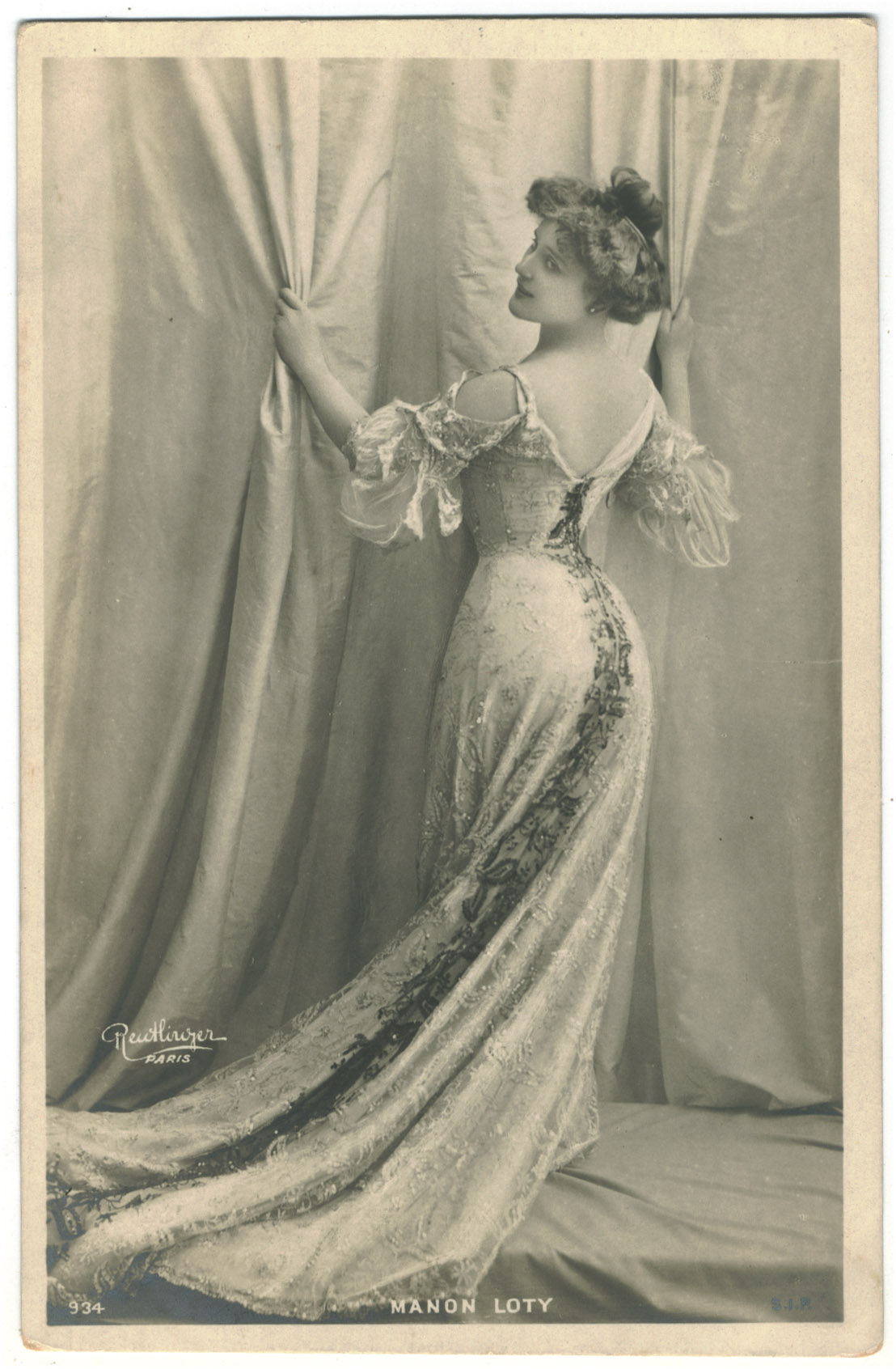
Photo of Nicholas's first love: famed French courtesan Manon Loti

In the summer of 1907, Nicholas and his brother went to Paris where he met the famed courtesan Manon Loti, who he fell in love with. When he returned to Saint Petersburg, his mother Zinaida pressured him to marry, settle down and secure the family line. She was growing increasingly concerned with her sons' infamous lifestyles. Maria Rasputin claims in her memoir that Nicholas was engaged to Countess Maria Evgenievna "Munya" Golovina (b. 1881), who later worked as Rasputin's secretary. However, while Nicholas' brother Felix often mentions Munya "Mademoiselle G." in his own memoirs, no mention is made of an engagement between her and his brother.

Sometime after, Prince Nicholas met the Countess Marina van der Heyden (1889 - 1974), a new lady-in-waiting to Alexandra Feodorovna. They met while acting in an amateur play. Countess Marina describes their first meeting in her memoir:

“...When we were introduced to each other, the look of Nicholas expressed for a second, a frank admiration, Then he turned away and retired to the back of the room. Accustomed to compliments and homage, his indifference stung me to the quick. It was perhaps this indifference which was the cause of the thunderbolt which embraced me at the first moment of our encounter. For the first time, I experienced the humiliation of total failure. Nicholas was not what is commonly called a handsome boy, he was very racy, very masculine, very charming. His mocking eyes had the gilded reflection of the chestnuts. His sensual mouth was both ironic and sad.”

They soon started an affair, but their mothers objected to it because Marina was already engaged to Count Arvid Viktor Clemens von Manteuffel (1879-1930). According to Felix Yusupov, it was also because of the girl's bad reputation.

On 22 April 1908, they said goodbye over dinner, and Marina married Count Arvid Ernestovich von Manteuffel the next day in front of 300 guests. However, only a month later, she wrote to Nicholas: "My dear, dear Nikolai, You know, I thought that I would die when I left you, I cried so much that I could hardly hold a pencil … I love you so much that I won’t bear it if you forget me now …" Nicholas followed Marina to Paris, where she had gone on her honeymoon and the two met secretly at the Hotel Maurice.

=== Duel and death ===
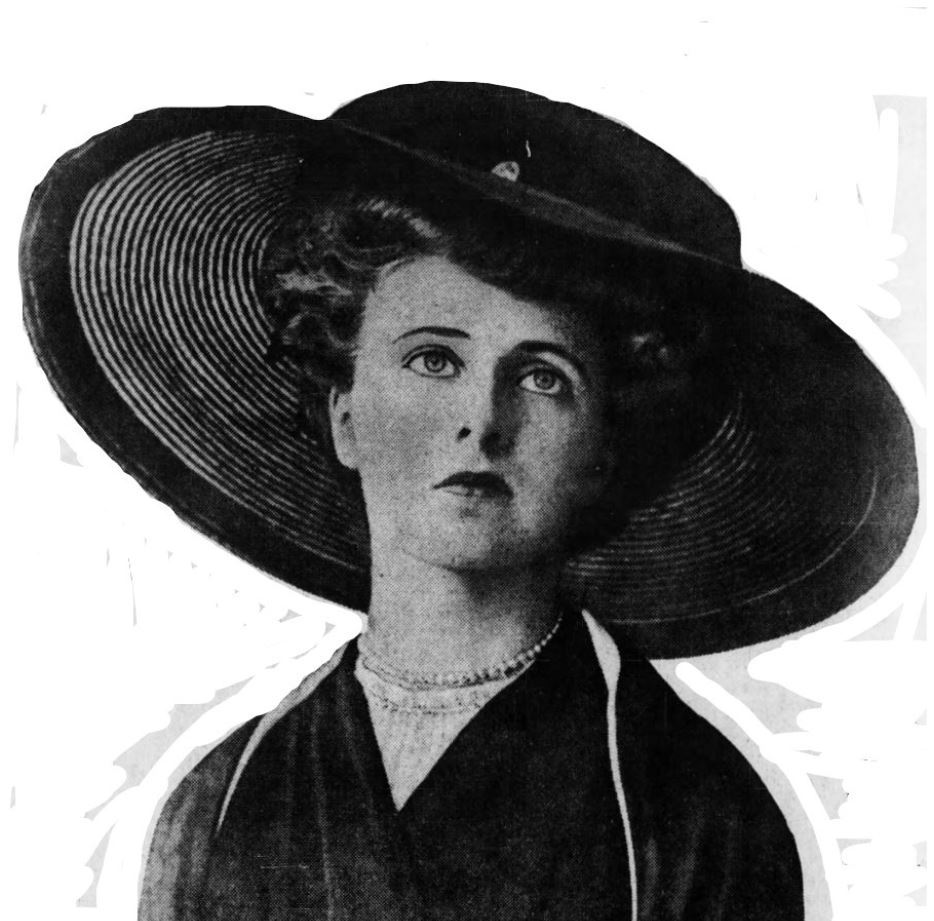
Photo of Prince Nicholas's lover: Countess Marina von Manteuffel née Countess van der Heiden (1889-1974)

According to Marina, while in Paris, Nicholas "cursed himself for not having married me. I swore to him that Arvid would be a husband in name only, and Nicholas implored me to tell him if my husband ever tried to assert his marital rights. He said he would kill him if he did." When Count Manteuffel found out about the affair, he challenged Nicholas to a duel.

Around this time, multiple clairvoyants got involved. Marina later wrote: "I consulted the great clairvoyant, Madame Fraya, who told me a great danger was hanging over me, and that the man I loved would die a violent death." Madame de Thèbes told Felix Yusupov that "a member of my family was in serious danger of dying in a duel." Meanwhile, Prince Nicholas was influenced by the Polish occultist Czesław Czyński, who convinced Nicholas that he was his guardian angel. According to Felix Yusupov, Czyński told Nicholas that it was his duty to marry Marina, and to not tell his parents about the duel.

In his last letter to Marina, Prince Nicholas wrote: "I am not afraid of death, but it’s hard for me to die away from you without seeing you one last time."

The duel with pistols at twenty paces took place on 5 July 1908. During the first round, Manteuffel missed and Nicholas shot in the air. The second time, Nicholas shot in the air and Manteuffel shot him in the chest, killing him instantly.

== Aftermath ==
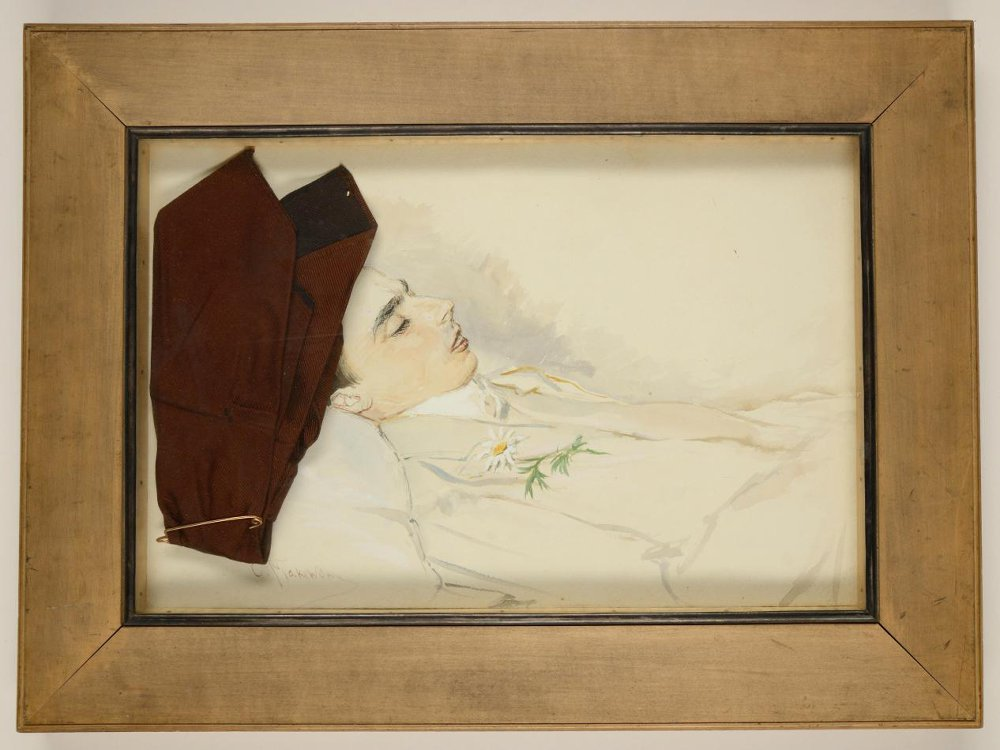
Portrait of Prince Nikolay Felixovich Yusupov in a coffin, painted by Konstantin Makovsky (1908)

The New York Sun printed an article on Prince Nicholas' death, that featured multiple falsehoods. It claimed that Count Manteuffel and Prince Nicholas had duelled once before already and that Manteuffel had considered suicide. There was no proof for either of these claims.

Prince Nicholas was buried at his parents' estate in Arkhangelskoye. His mother never fully recovered from the depression that followed her elder son's death. His younger brother Felix, now heir to his brother's income and estates, was banished in 1916 for murdering Grigori Rasputin.

Countess Marina divorced Count Manteuffel, who died in 1930, and married Colonel Mikhail Chichagov in 1916. They had a child, who died in infancy and moved to France. She died in Monte Carlo in 1974, having written down her account of the affair which included love letters from and to Nicholas.

His father later named his illegitimate son after Nicholas.

== Estates ==
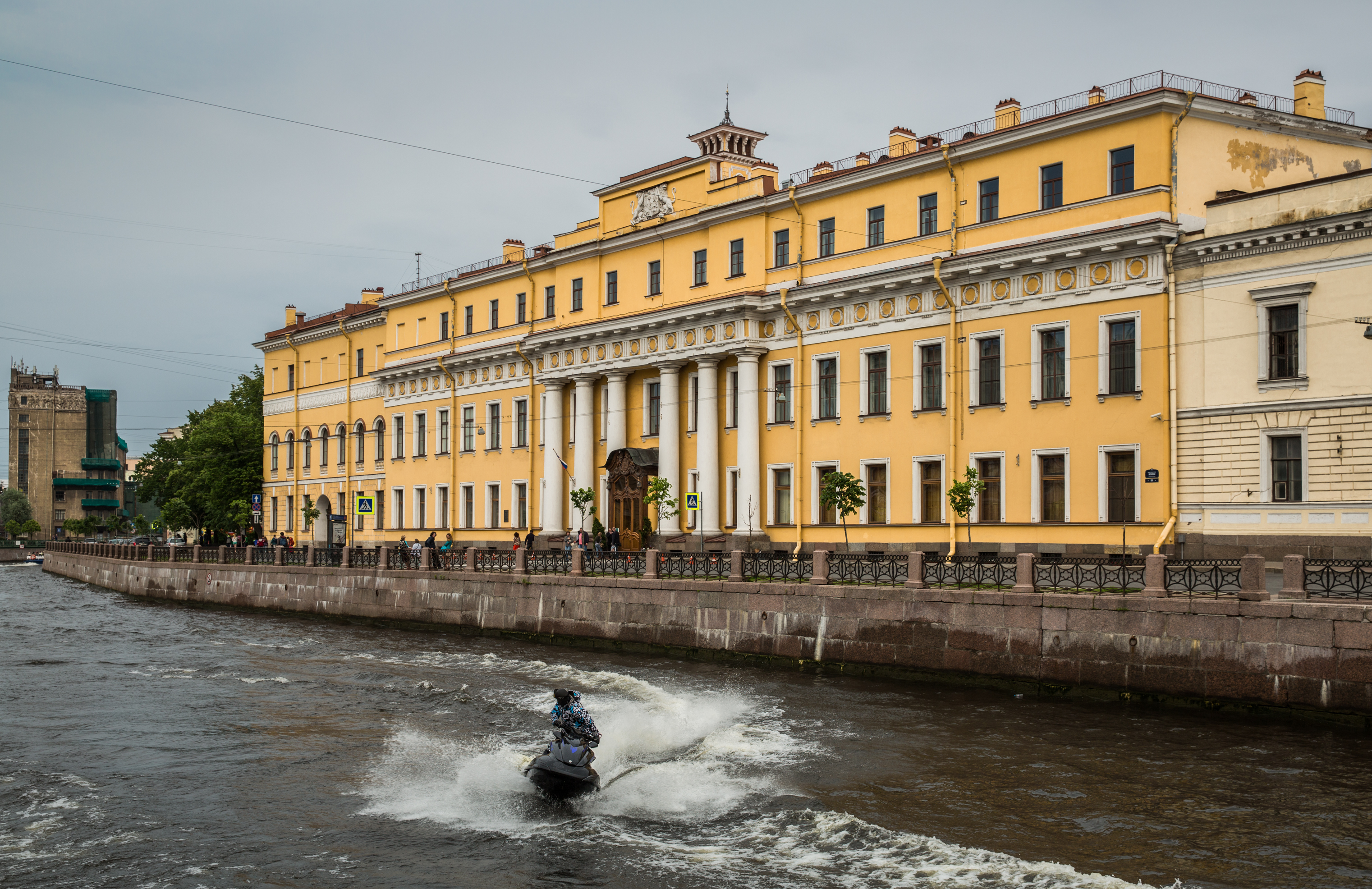
Moika Palace, Saint Petersburg

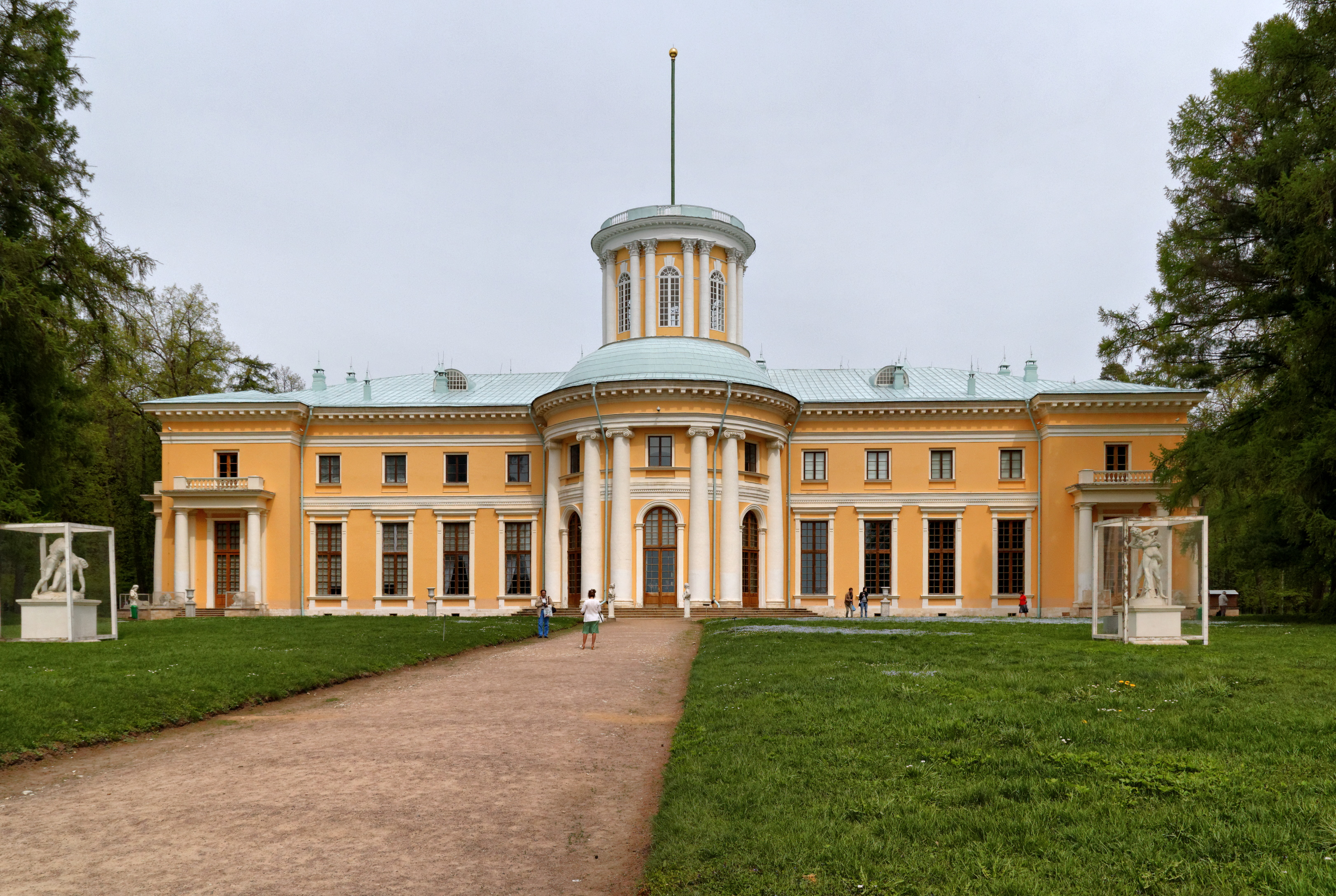
Arkhangelskoye Palace

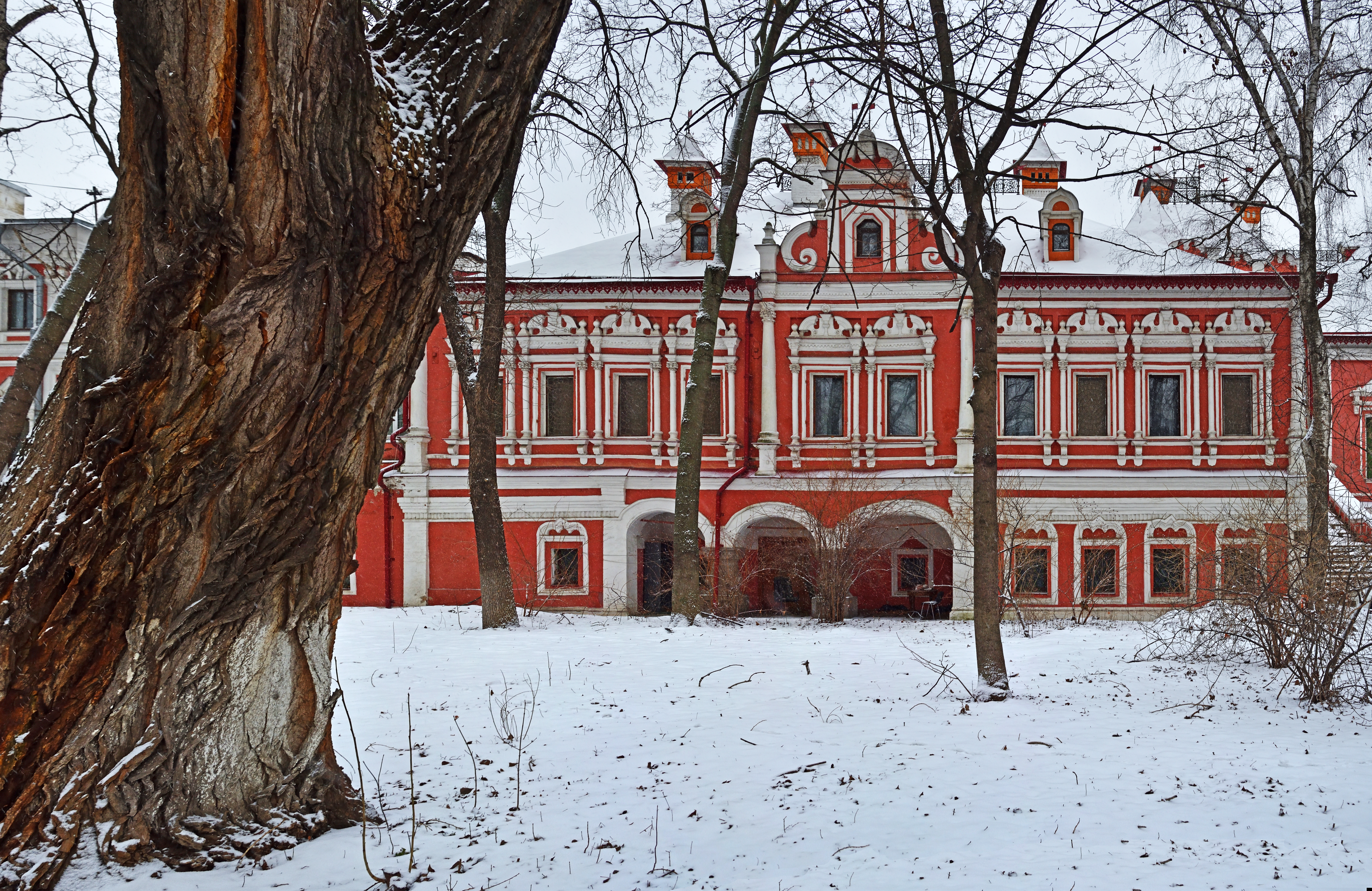
Yusupov Palace, Moscow

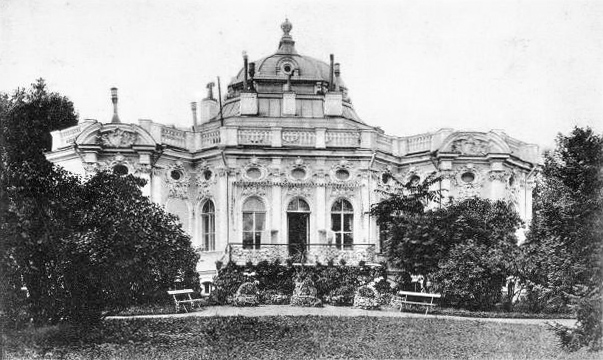
Yusupov Dacha, Tsarskoye Selo

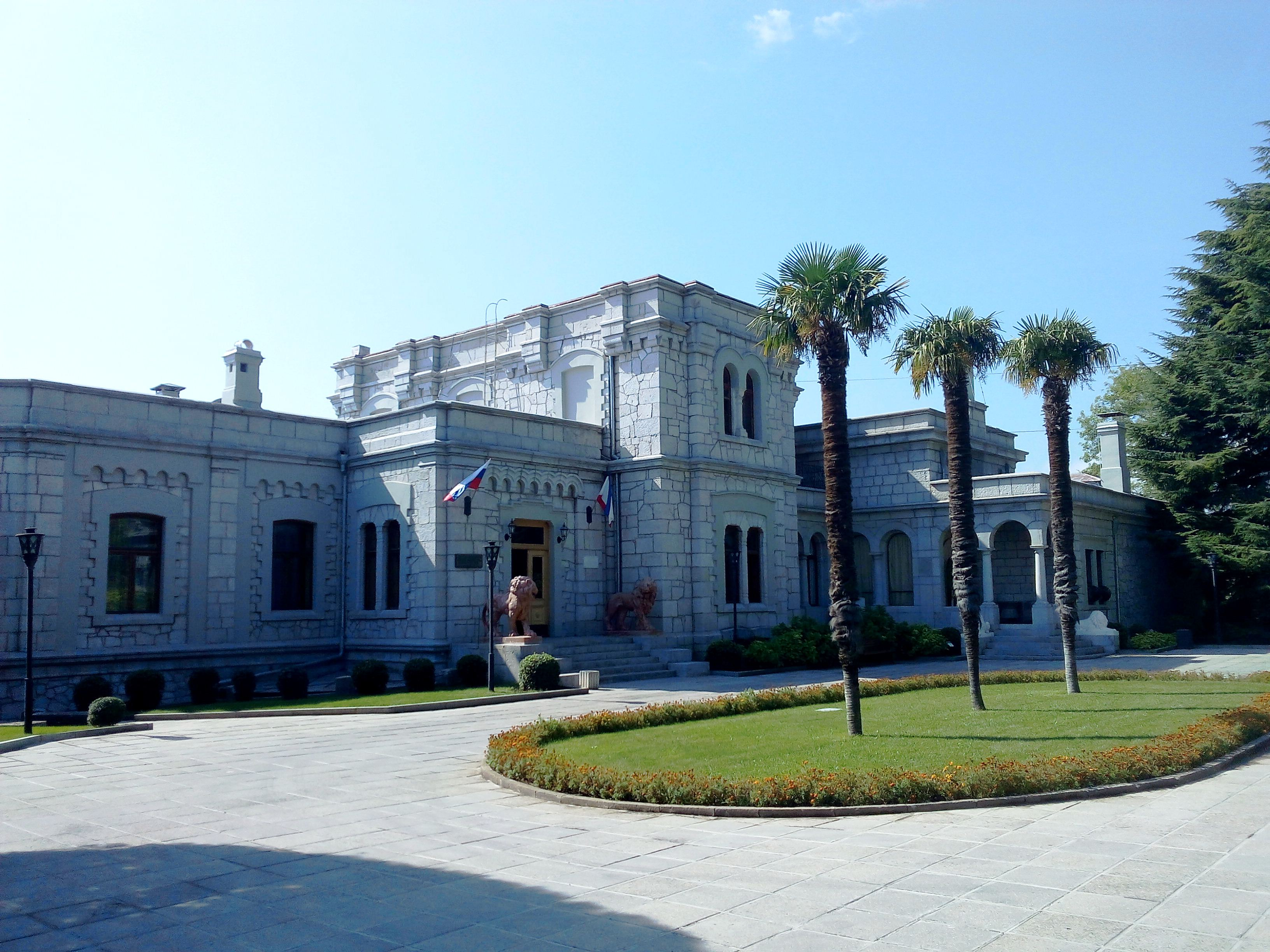
Yusupov Palace, Crimea

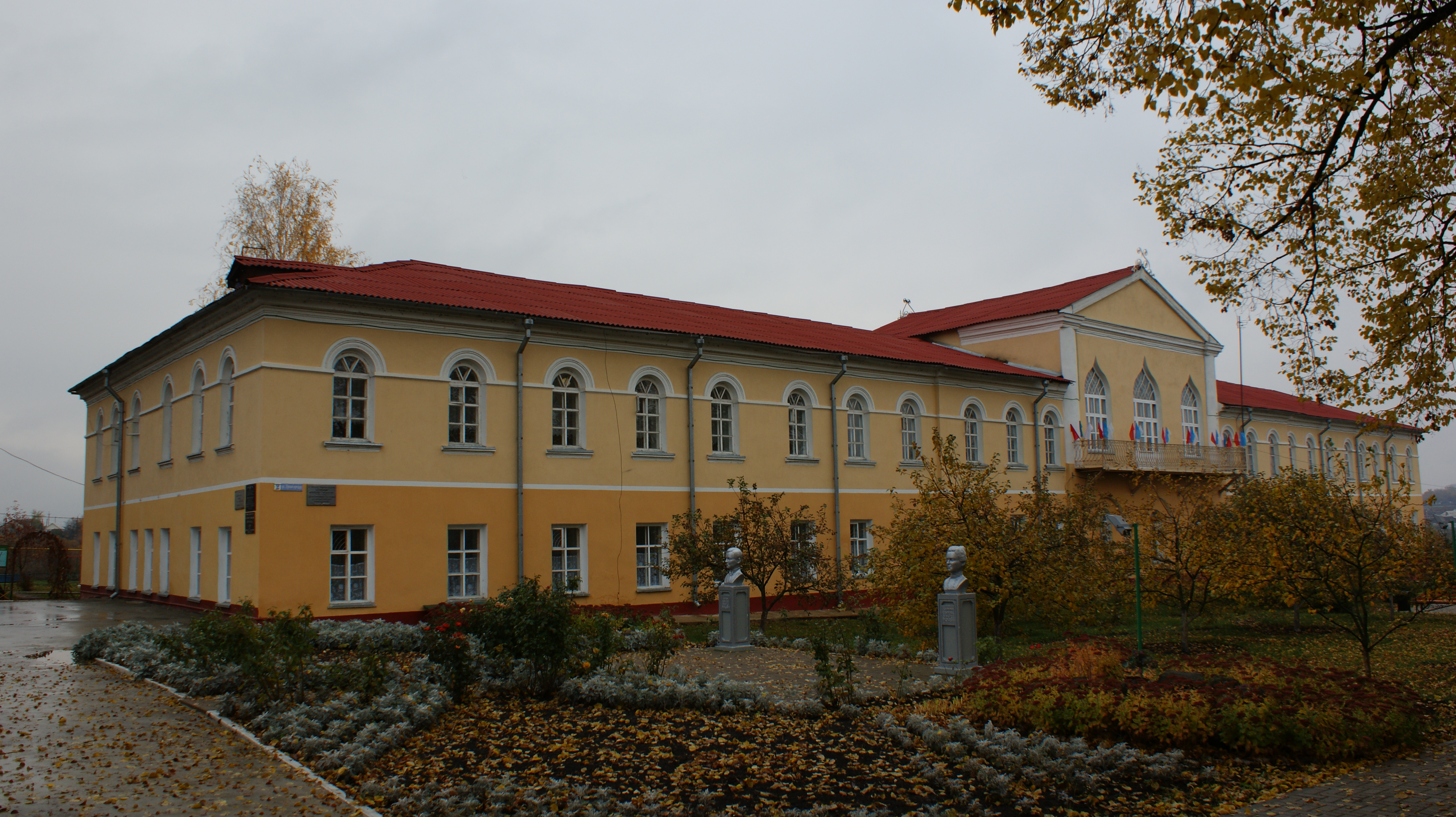
Yusupov Hunting Lodge, Rakitnoye

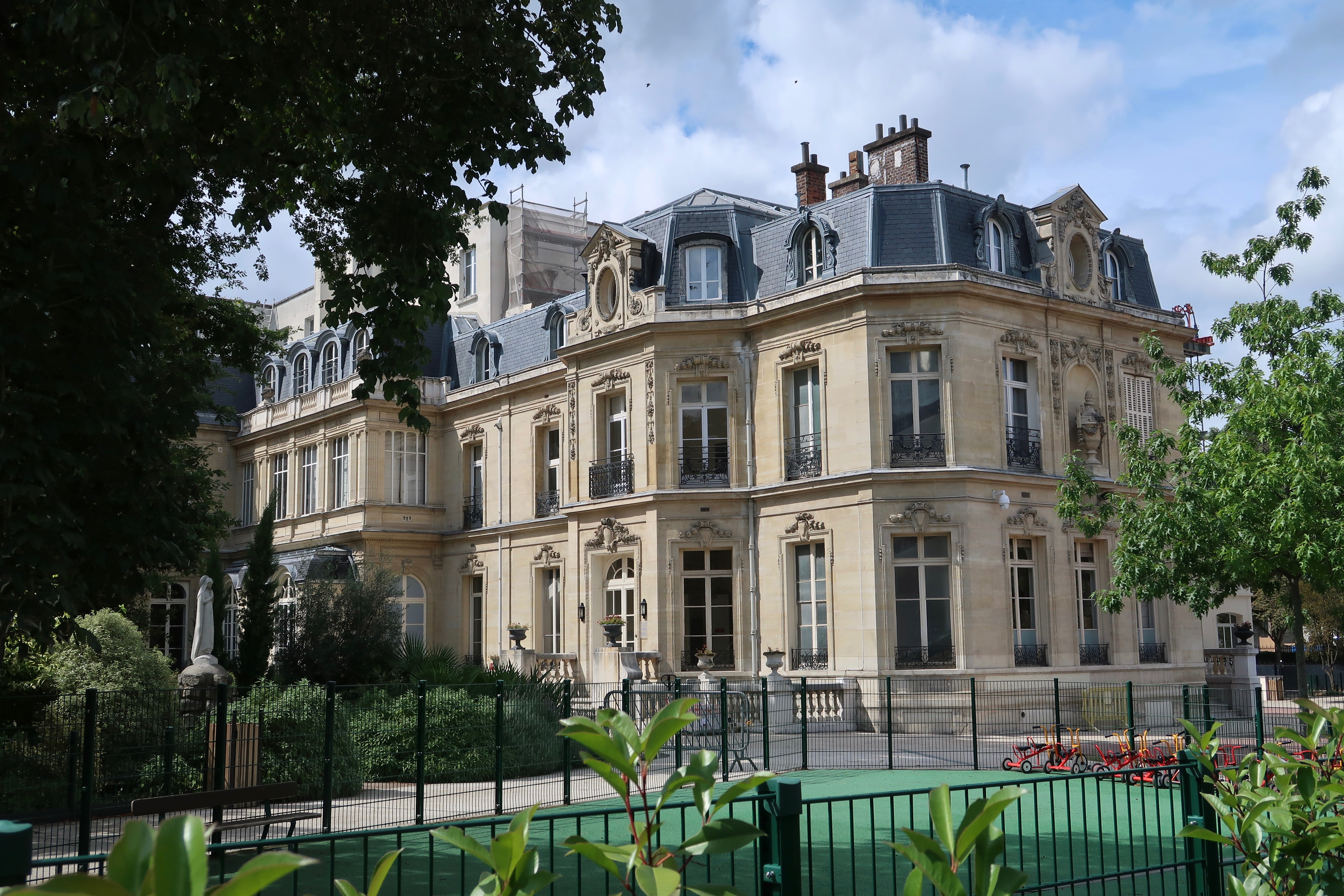
Yusupov House in Bois de Boulogne, Paris, inherited from his great-grandmother
