= Albert Stopford =

British antiques/art dealer and diplomatic courier

Albert Henry Stopford
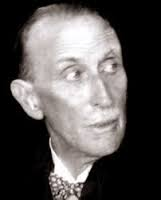
- Born: 16 May 1860
- Died: 10 February 1939 (aged 78)
- Occupations: Antiques/arts dealer, diplomatic courier

Albert Henry Stopford (16 May 1860 – 10 February 1939), known as Bertie Stopford, was a British antiques and art dealer specialising in Fabergé and Cartier and diplomatic courier; he was an intimate of the Romanovs. He rescued the jewels of Grand Duchess Vladimir the Elder during the Russian Revolution.

== Life ==
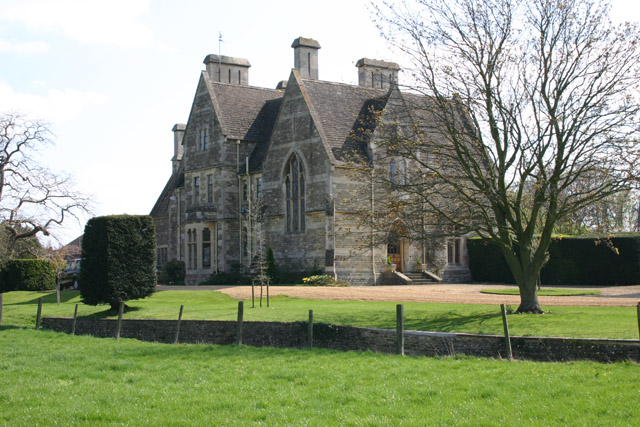
The old Rectory in Titchmarsh

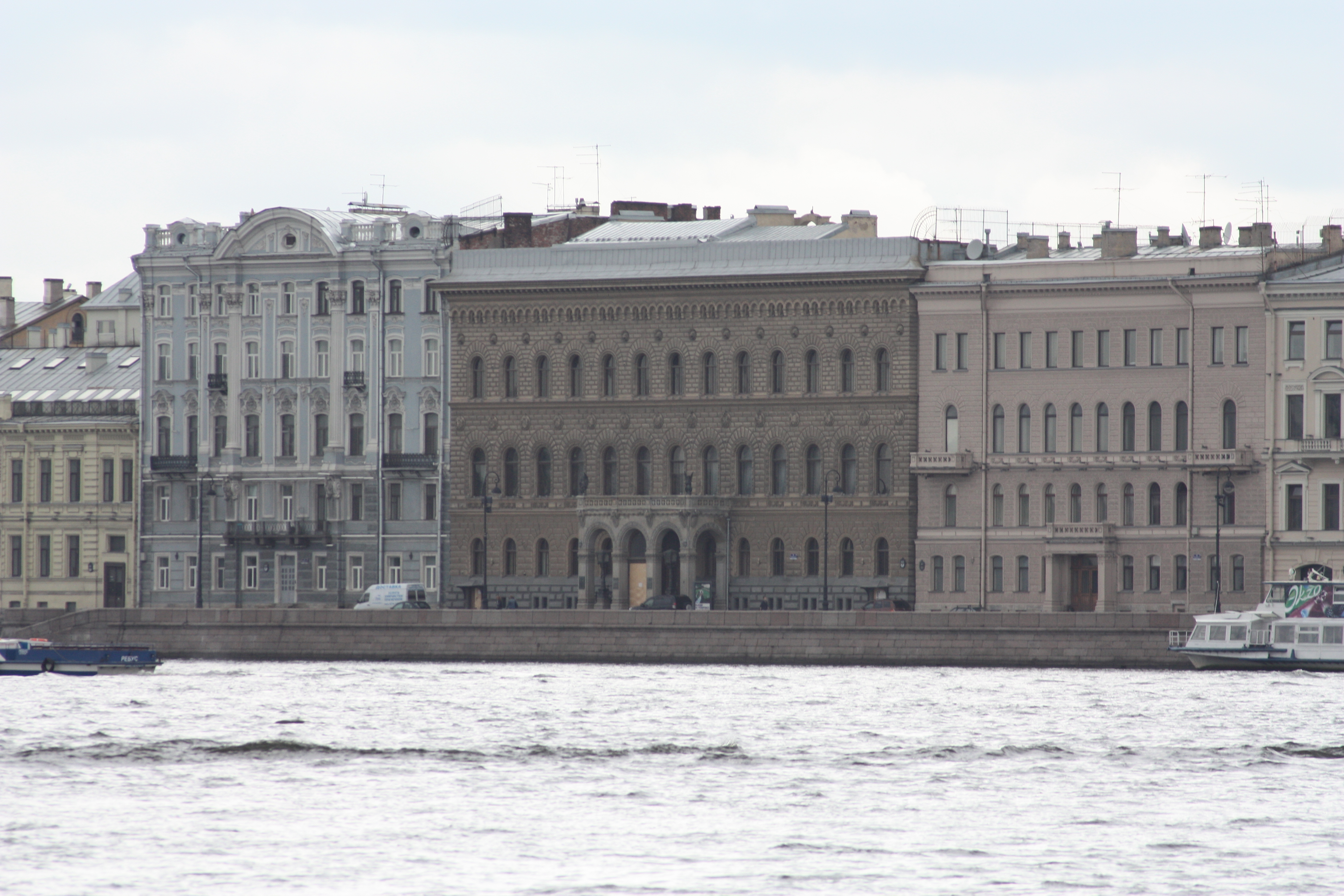
Vladimir Palace in the middle

Stopford's father, the Reverend Frederick Manners Stopford, was a grandson of the 3rd Earl of Courtown. He had been a student in arts, but was a rector between 1861 and 1912 at Titchmarsh, Northamptonshire. He had connections to Queen Victoria, King Edward VII and King George V. Stopford was able to use these connections to become a high class antique dealer.

In November 1881, Stopford lived in Belgravia. Around 1900 he was "the celebrated leader of cotillions" in London. In January 1901 he lived in Taormina, Sicily a tolerant place that also attracted Oscar Wilde, and Wilhelm von Gloeden. In 1909 Stopford met with Felix Yussupov, who showed him Arkhangelskoye Palace near Moscow. In May 1913 he was in Paris; and at some time in Salsomaggiore Terme; in March 1914 in St. Petersburg; in October 1914 in Ypres, Belgium.

At some time Stopford offered the War Office his services as the eyes and ears in Petrograd. From July 1915 till September 1917 he was staying in Grand Hotel Europe Saint Petersburg, Moscow and Tsarskoye Selo with unknown affairs. He went to the front with his friend Grand Duchess Vladimir, then to Tbilisi and Kiev. Three times he went back to England for a short period, maybe carrying letters. He was friendly with Serge Obolensky. In April 1917 he visited the Grand Duchess in Kislovodsk, a spa in the Northern Caucasus. In June he met with Felix Yusupov in Yalta. In July Yusupov showed him the Moika Palace and the spot where Rasputin was murdered. In August Stopford revisited the Grand Duchess and brought her money hidden in his shoes. She supplied him with the necessary information on how to access her jewellery in the Vladimir Palace. Stopford travelled to Mogilev. He met with Lady Muriel Paget; Stopford complained there was nothing to eat in Saint Petersburg.

During August or September 1917, together with Grand Duke Boris, Stopford was able to smuggle out some of Grand Duchess's significant jewellery collection from the Vladimir Palace. At the end of September 1917 he left for England, via Sweden and Aberdeen, with a total of 244 items in two Gladstone bags. The Vladimir Tiara was inherited by Queen Elizabeth II directly from her grandmother, Queen Mary, in 1953.

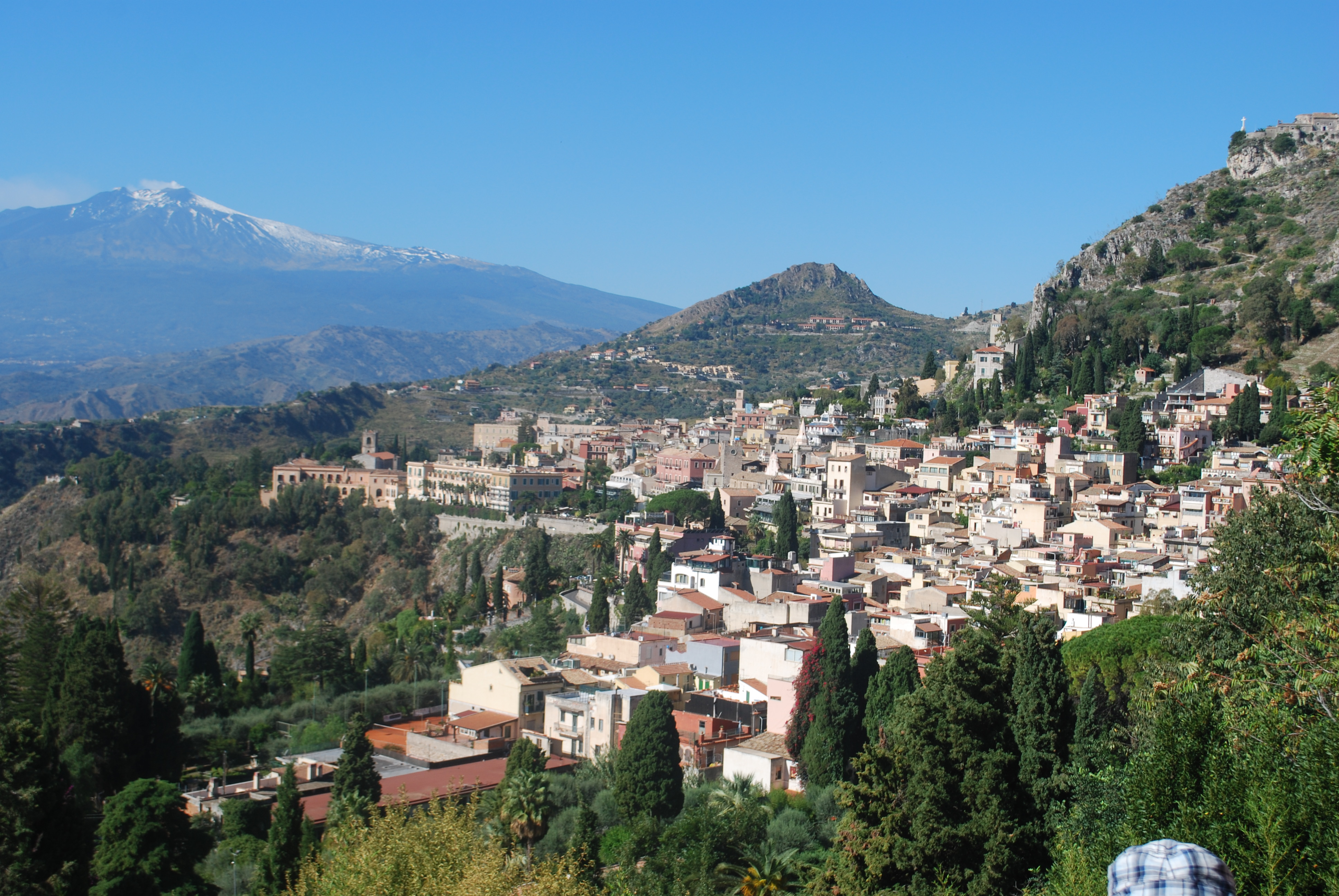
Taormina and Mt Etna

Within months of his return to London he was embroiled in a homosexual scandal (caught in Hyde Park) and a trial at the Old Bailey. He served in Wormwood Scrubs in 1918/1919. It is probably there Stopford wrote an autobiography, published anonymously in 1919 as The Russian Diary of an Englishman: Petrograd 1915–1917. Its entries detail the Imperial family, Russian politicians, the peace offered by Germany in December 1916, the murder of Grigori Rasputin, the official police report, the February Revolution, and the Russian Provisional Government.

In 1920 Stopford left for the continent and never returned to England. He was in Venice to receive the Duchess Vladimir, who had escaped from Russia. In 1922 he was living in Taormina, and friendly with D. H. Lawrence, Tennessee Williams, Jean Cocteau and Jean Marais.

In 1924 he was living in the prestigious 31, Rue de Valois in Paris, according to the list of Fellows of the Zoological Society of London. Between 1924 and 1934 he corresponded with Ralph B. Strassburger and for this wealthy businessman probably acquired antiques, now in the Winterthur Museum, Delaware.

Stopford died in 1939 and was buried in Bagneux Cemetery.

== Sources ==
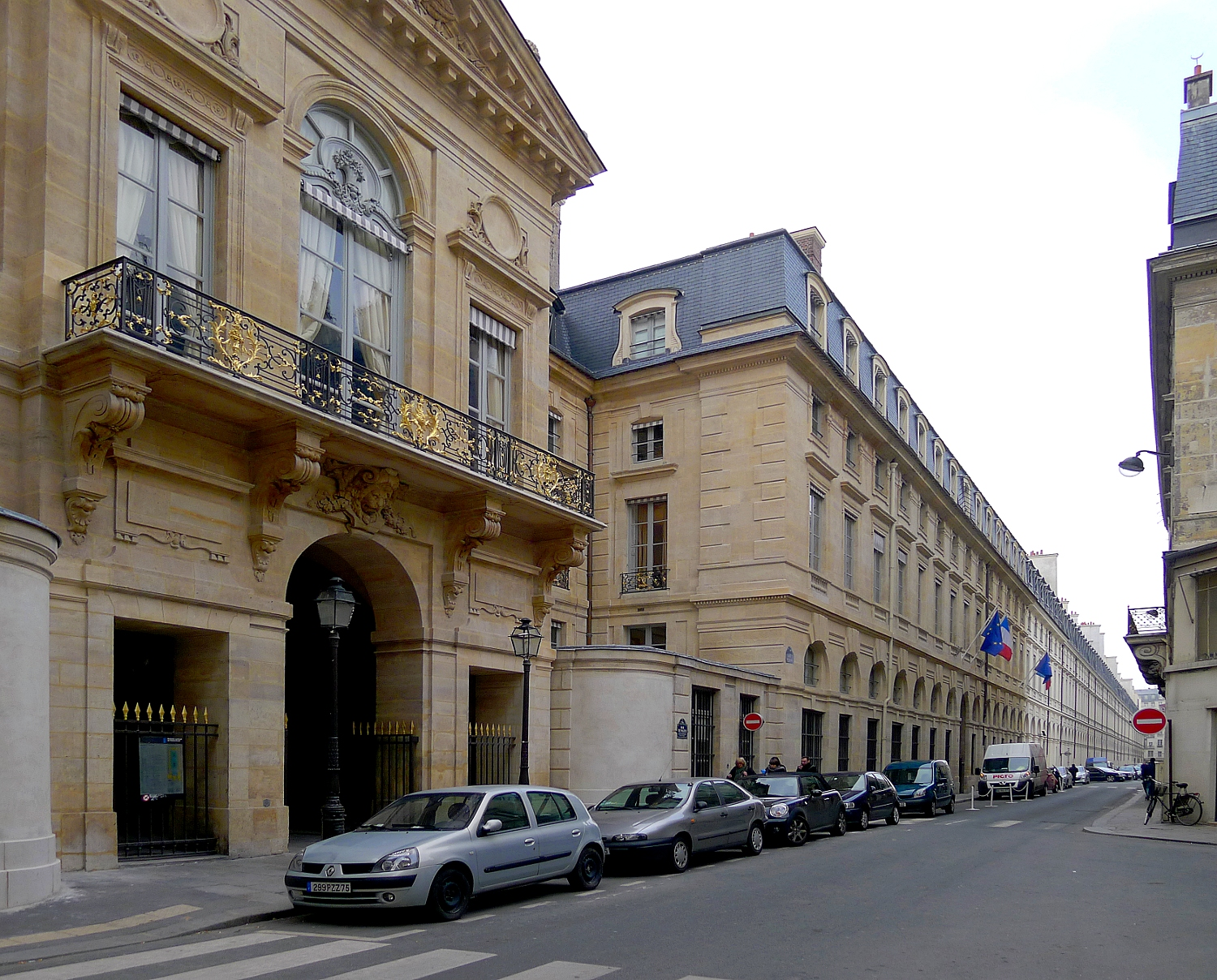
Rue de Valois

- Boulton, James T., ed. (2002). The Letters of D. H. Lawrence (Revised ed.). Cambridge University Press. ISBN 0521007003.
- Chaney, Edward (2014). The Evolution of the Grand Tour: Anglo-Italian Cultural Relations Since the Renaissance. Routledge. ISBN 978-1317973676.}
- Gelardi, Julia P. (2011). From Splendor to Revolution: The Romanov women, 1847–1928. St. Martin's Press. ISBN 978-1429990943.
- Perry, John Curtis; Pleshakov, Constantine V. (2008). Flight of the Romanovs: A Family Saga. Basic Books. ISBN 978-0786724864.
- The Russian diary of an Englishman, Petrograd, 1915–1917. Great Britain: Open Library. 1919.
- Volodarsky, Boris (2015). Stalin's Agent: The Life and Death of Alexander Orlov. Oxford University Press. ISBN 978-0199656585.
