= Sokolyne =

Sokolyne Соколине
- Village
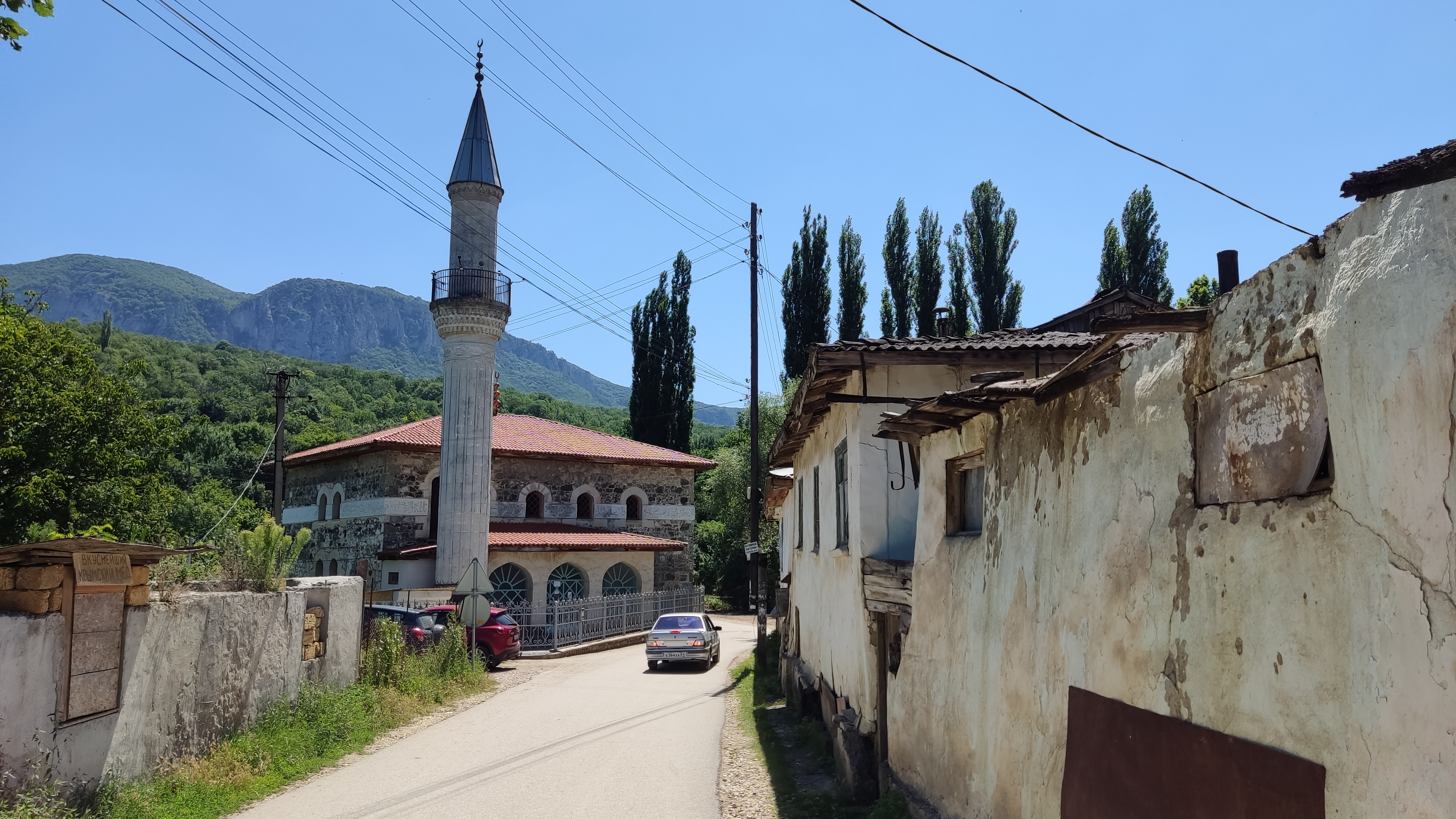

- Location of Sokolyne on a map of Crimea.
- Coordinates: 44°33′00″N 33°57′34″E
- Country: Disputed; Russia, Ukraine
- Republic: Crimea
- District: Bakhchysarai Raion
- Elevation: 281 m (922 ft)

Population (2014)
  - Total: 1,251
- Time zone: UTC+4 (MSK)
- Index: 98475
- Area code: +380-6554

Sokolyne (Russian: Соколиное; Ukrainian: Соколине; Crimean Tatar: Kökköz) is a village in Bakhchysarai Raion (district) of the Autonomous Republic of Crimea, a territory recognized by a majority of countries as part of Ukraine and incorporated by Russia as the Republic of Crimea. Population: 1,251 (2014 Census).

Historical Populations
Year	Pop.	±%
1864	869	—
1887	1,449	+66.7%
1897	1,687	+16.4%
1926	1,630	−3.4%
1939	1,898	+16.4%
1989		—
2001	1,396	—

== Gallery ==
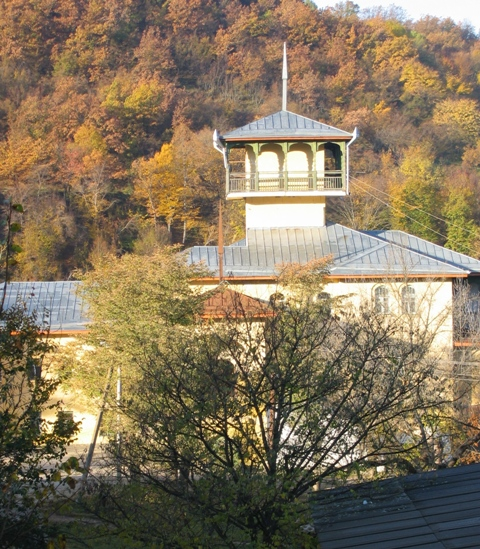

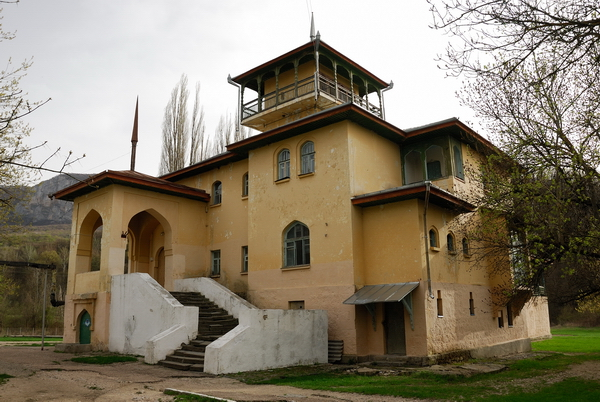
Hunting Lodge of Prince Felix Yusupov in Kokkoz

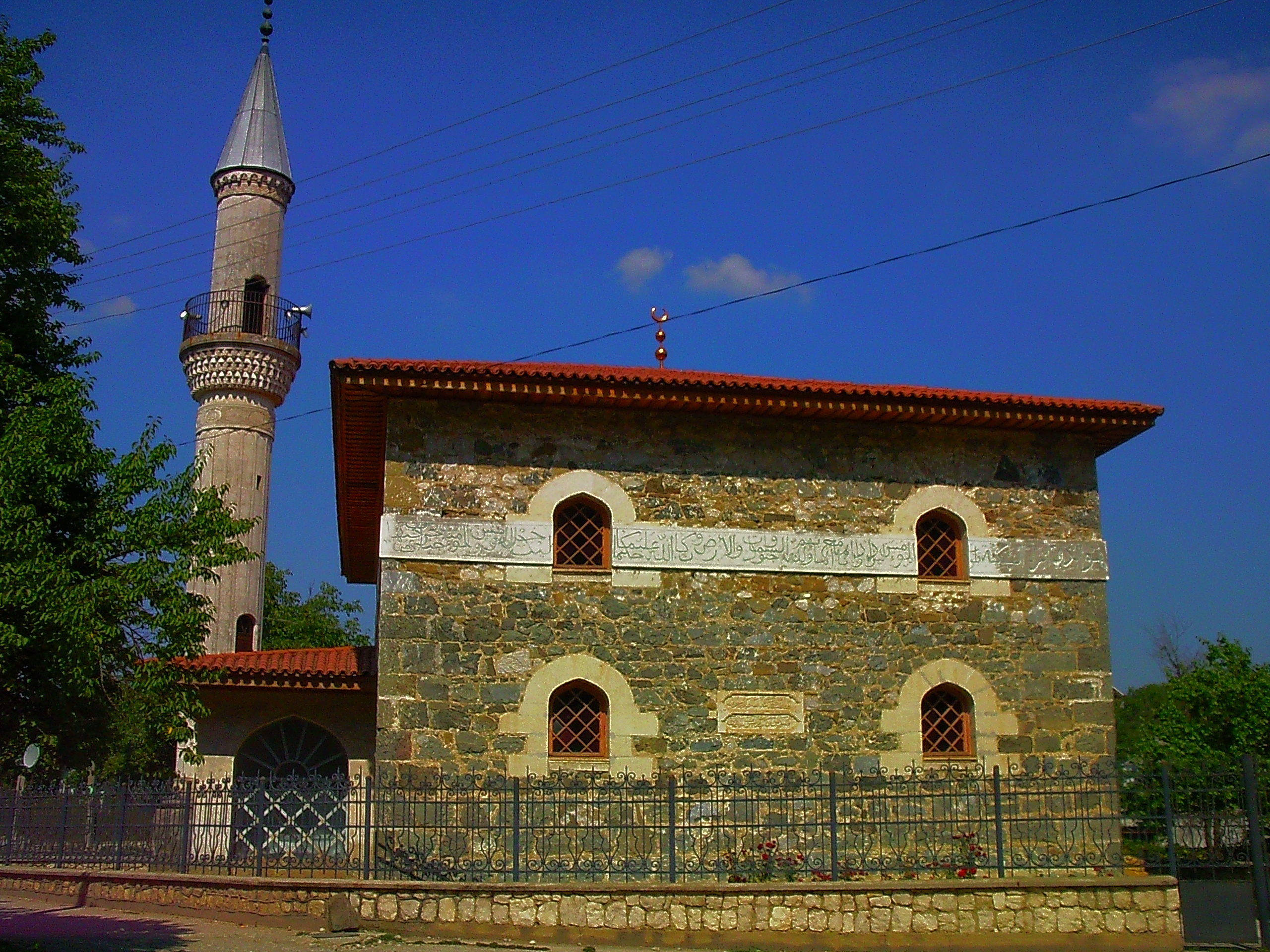
Yusupov's Mosque
