= Slanec =

Slanec Salzburg
- Municipality
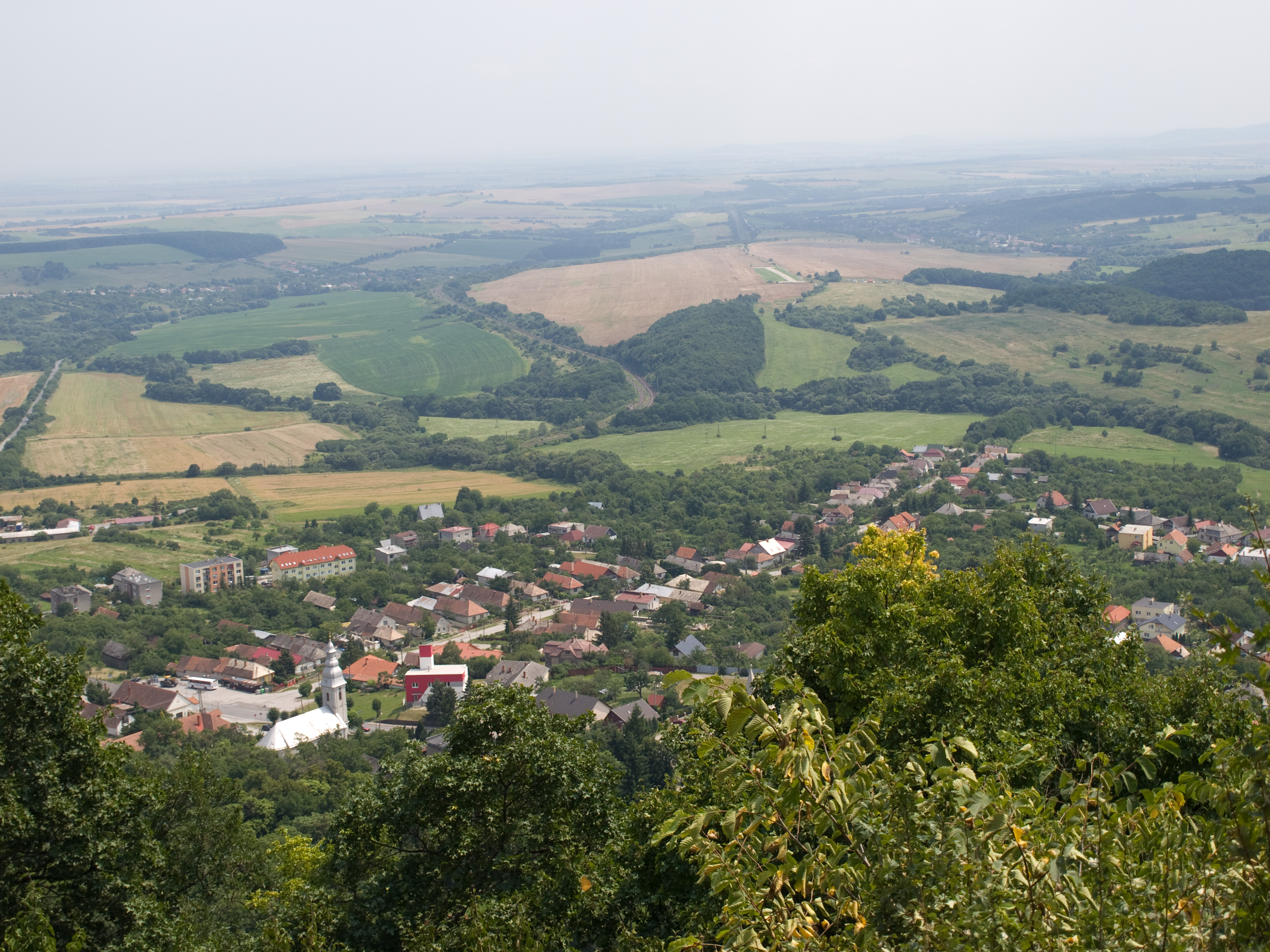

- Flag

- Location of Slanec in the Košice Region Location of Slanec in Slovakia
- Coordinates: 48.64°N 21.48°E
- Country: Slovakia
- Region: Košice Region
- District: Košice-okolie District
- First mentioned: 1230

Area
  - Total: 20.45 km^{2} (7.90 sq mi)
- Elevation: 343 m (1,125 ft)

Population (2025)
  - Total: 1,502
- Time zone: UTC+1 (CET)
  - Summer (DST): UTC+2 (CEST)
- Postal code: 441 7
- Area code: +421 55
- Vehicle registration plate (until 2022): KS
- Website: www.slanec.sk

Slanec (German: Salzburg; Hungarian: Nagyszalánc; Latin: Castrum Salis) is a village and municipality in Košice-okolie District in the Košice Region of eastern Slovakia.

== History ==
In historical records the village was first mentioned in 1230 (Castrum Salis) as an important fortress. In 1270 King Stephen V of Hungary gave the castle to Master Reinhold. The new lords of Slanec supported King Přemysl Otakar II against King Ladislav in the conquest of the Bohemian throne. King Ladislav conquered Slanec in 1281. In 1299 the castle passed to the Szalanczyi noble family and, successively, to landowners by the surnames of Lossonczy and Forgách. In 1649, it was besieged by the rebel condottiere György Rákoczi.

== Geography ==
The municipality lies at an altitude of 343 metres (1,125 ft) and covers an area of 20.45 km^{2} (7.90 sq mi) (2025).

== Transportation ==
The village has a railway station.

== Population ==
Population statistic (10 years)
| Year | 1995 | 2005 | 2015 | 2025 |
|---|---|---|---|---|
| Count | 1256 | 1309 | 1470 | 1502 |
| Difference | | +4.21% | +12.29% | +2.17% |

Population statistic
| Year | 2024 | 2025 |
|---|---|---|
| Count | 1500 | 1502 |
| Difference | | +0.13% |

It has a population of 1502 people (31 December 2025).

=== Ethnicity ===
Census 2021 (1+ %)
| Ethnicity | Number | Fraction |
|---|---|---|
| Slovak | 1364 | 91.6% |
| Not found out | 80 | 5.37% |
| Romani | 51 | 3.42% |
| Total | 1489 | |

In year 2021 was 1489 people by ethnicity 1364 as Slovak, 80 as Not found out, 51 as Romani, 13 as Hungarian, 9 as Czech, 3 as Russian, 2 as Serbian, 2 as Rusyn and 2 as Polish.

Note on population: The difference values of population numbers in the table "Population statistic" and in the sections "Ethnicity" & "Religion" is caused by the use of various statistical methods.

=== Religion ===
Census 2021 (1+ %)
| Religion | Number | Fraction |
|---|---|---|
| Roman Catholic Church | 899 | 60.38% |
| None | 213 | 14.3% |
| Calvinist Church | 204 | 13.7% |
| Not found out | 76 | 5.1% |
| Greek Catholic Church | 43 | 2.89% |
| Evangelical Church | 31 | 2.08% |
| Total | 1489 | |

In year 2021 was 1489 people by religion 899 from Roman Catholic Church, 213 from None, 204 from Calvinist Church, 76 from Not found out, 43 from Greek Catholic Church, 31 from Evangelical Church, 6 from Paganism and natural spirituality, 6 from Other and not ascertained christian church, 4 from Eastern Orthodox Church, 3 from Jehovah's Witnesses, 1 from Christian Congregations in Slovakia, 1 from Other, 1 from Hinduism and 1 from Apostolic Church.
