= Sumarokov =

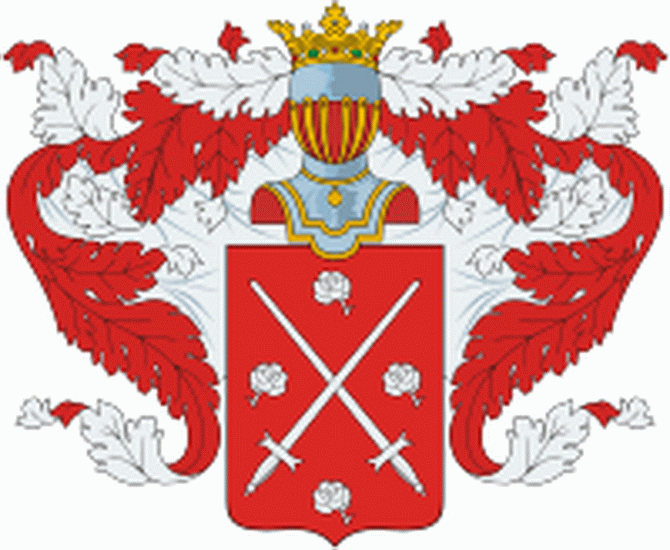
Coat of arms of the Sumarokov family

The Sumarokov family is an old Russian noble family dating back to the 15th century, originated in either Sweden or Lithuania. Members of the family held the title of Count in the Russian Empire.

== Notable people ==
- Alexander Sumarokov (1717–1777), Russian poet and playwright
- Ekaterina Kniazhnina (née Sumarokova, 1746–1797), Russian poet, daughter of Alexander
- Tatyana Sumarokova (1922–1977), aviator
- Felix Sumarokov-Elston (1820–1877), Russian general and administrator
- Mikhail Sumarokov-Elston (1894–1970), Russian tennis player
