= Marie Antoinette Diamond Earrings =

Historic Jewelry

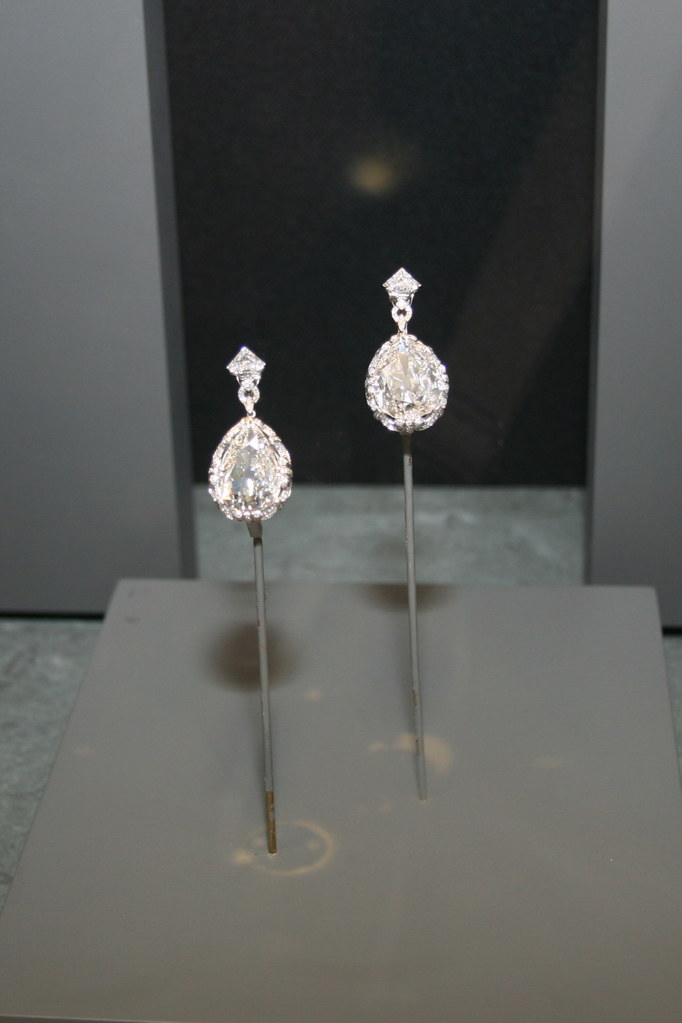
The Marie Antoinette Diamond Earrings on display at the Smithsonian National Museum of Natural History in Washington, D.C.

The Marie Antoinette Diamond Earrings are a pair of diamond earrings on permanent display in the Smithsonian National Museum of Natural History in Washington, D.C., United States. They are so named for their assumed provenance: that they were commissioned by King Louis XVI of France for his wife, Queen Marie Antoinette. While there is limited documentation and circumstantial evidence attesting to the truth of this claim, the origin of the earrings has never been definitively proven.

== Description ==
The earliest attested version of the earrings was purchased by Marjorie Merriweather Post from Pierre C. Cartier in 1928. At this point, they comprised a pair of pear-shaped diamond drops—20.34 and 14.25 carats in weight respectively—sourced from either India or Brazil. The diamonds were installed in silver settings with gold links. The links were decorated with smaller mine cut diamonds embedded in scrollwork. Post later commissioned Cartier to replace the tops of the earrings with triangular diamonds mounted in platinum links. As such, the original tops of the earrings have been lost. The primary stones of both earrings are relatively rare colourless high-clarity type IIa diamonds.

In 1959, Post commissioned Harry Winston, Inc. to replace the remaining silver and gold settings with platinum replicas, studded with additional smaller diamonds and metal links. The central diamond drops were made detachable from the replica settings to allow them to be placed into one of Ms Post's necklaces, flanking a smaller 13.95 carat triangular diamond. Upon the sale of the earrings to the Smithsonian Institution, the additional diamonds and links were removed, though the new platinum settings and the Cartier tops remain. The original silver-and-gold settings remain intact, though not on display with their replacements.

== Provenance ==
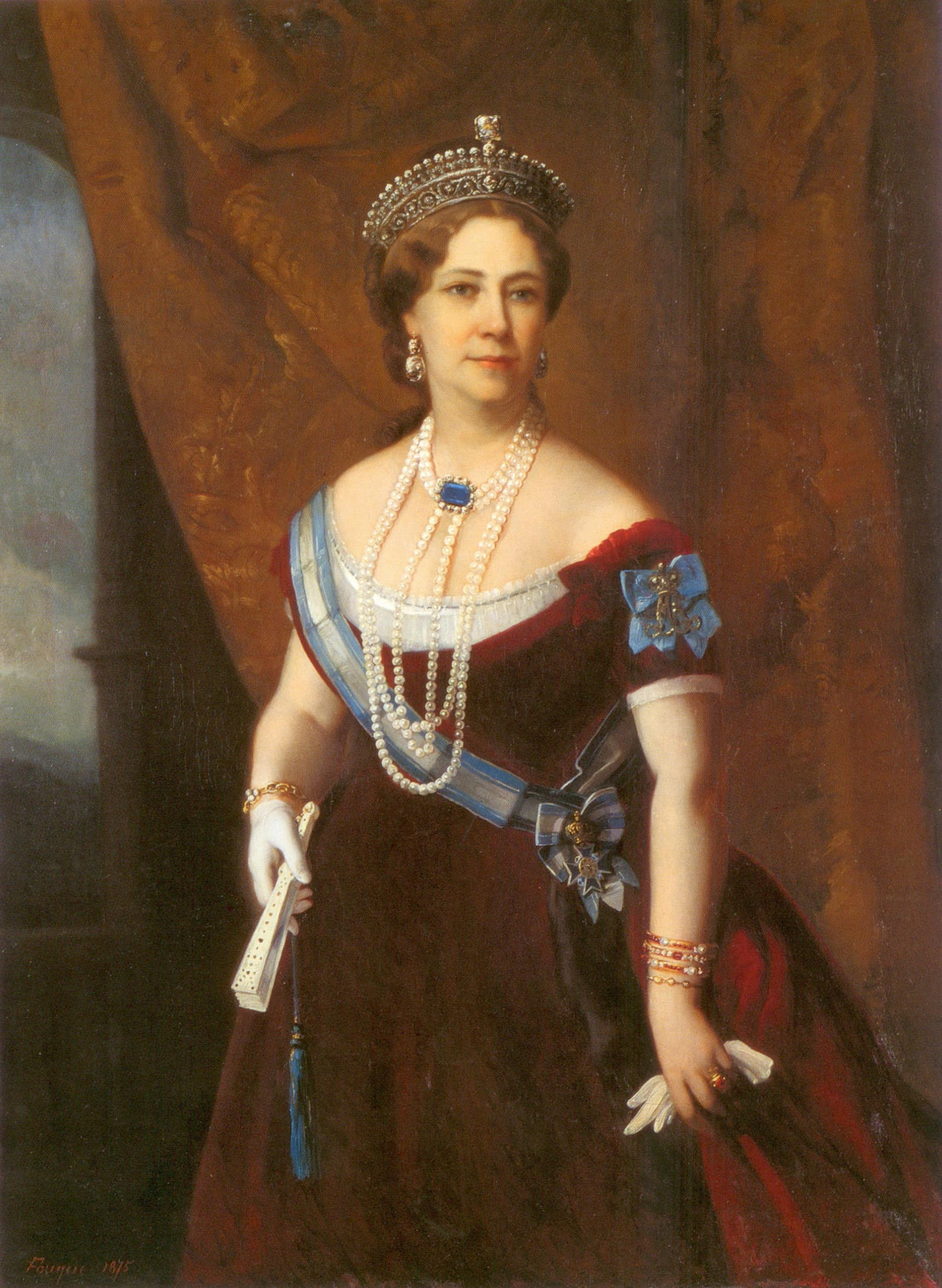
An 1875 portrait of Princess Tatiana Alexandrovna Yusupova, wearing the earrings

The earrings have been on display in the Janet Annenberg Hooker Hall of Geology, Gems, and Minerals at the Smithsonian Institution's National Museum of Natural History for several decades. They were purchased from Eleanor Post Hutton in 1964, alongside their original settings. Hutton had inherited them from her mother, Marjorie Merriweather Post. Post had purchased the earrings from Pierre C. Cartier in 1928.

Cartier had provided Post with documentation from Prince Felix Felixovich Yusupov of Russia, from whom he had purchased the earrings earlier that year. This included an affidavit signed by Yusupov's mother, Zinaida Yusupova, attesting that the earrings had belonged to the family for over a century, having been purchased by her great-grandmother Princess Tatiana Yusupova, that their settings had never been replaced, that these facts could be proven from family documents and portraits (which did not survive the Yusupova family's flight from the Russian Revolution), and that:

"According to family tradition, they were one of the last presents of Louis XVI to his queen; she wore them constantly; they were found in her pocket after the arrest of the French royal family at Varennes."

The missing Yusupova family records, which were never recovered post-Revolution, preclude any absolute determination of the earrings' provenance. However, there is at least an attested history of the claim being made through multiple generations. A portrait of Princess Tatiana Alexandrovna Yusupova, Zinaida's mother, was made in 1875 by French artist Jean-Baptiste Marie Fouque, with the subject wearing the earrings and the claim of their provenance noted by the State Museum of the History of St. Petersburg. The last will of Zenaida Ivanovna Naryshkina, the eponymous grandmother of Zenaida Yusupova, requested that her jewelry, including the Polar Star Diamond and her "earrings, so-called pendants of the Queen Marie Antoinette," go to Zinaida.

=== Before the Yusupovas ===
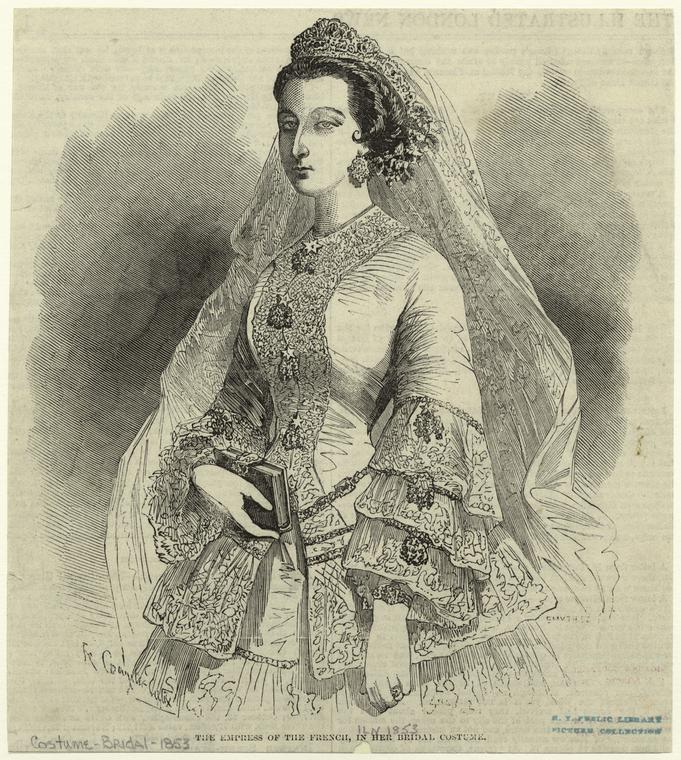
An 1853 engraving of Eugénie de Montijo, whose earrings are a possible candidate for the Marie Antoinette Earrings

The claimed origin of the earrings—that they once belonged to Marie Antoinette—has been investigated by scholars of the Smithsonian Institution several times in the decades after their acquisition, with inconclusive results. Liana Paredes, a biographer of Marjorie Merriweather Post, cites Germain Bapst's Histoire des Joyaux de la Couronne de France, who in turn quotes Madame Campan, Marie Antoinette's lady's maid:

"Mr. Boehmer, court jeweler, had assembled six large diamonds on order of Louis XV for [Madame] Du Barry but were not given before the king's death. So, Mr. Boehmer set two as earrings and offered them to the new queen. Marie Antoinette could not afford the four hundred thousand livres and turned them down. The king increased her allowance and she obtained them."

Paredes points out, however, that the term used by Bapst to describe the earrings in this passage describes a style of earring that matches poorly with the Marie Antoinette Earrings.

The Smithsonian's chairman, Jeffrey Edward Post, put forward an alternative theory for the earrings, quoting from the 1889 memoirs of Amélie Carette, a close courtier of Empress Eugenie:

"The personal jewels of the Empress consisted of a casket of the greatest value. Among others, there were some magnificent earrings, shaped like large pears, in diamonds, which originally belonged to the Queen Marie Antoinette, the Empress obtaining possession of them on her marriage, together with a necklace of most valuable pearls..."

Several images of Eugenie wearing these earrings exist, including a set of engravings produced for an 1853 wedding issue of The Illustrated London News. The memoirs note that Eugenie took her personal jewelry to England after the Franco-Prussian War, selling most of it between 1870 and 1872. Post posits that these may be the earrings purchased and worn by the Yusupovas.
