= Yusupov =

Yusupov (Russian: Юсу́пов) or Yusupova (feminine; Юсу́пова) is a common in the countries of the former Soviet Union, meaning "Son of Joseph." It may refer to:

- House of Yusupov, royal Russian family, of Tatar descent
  - Felix Yusupov (1887–1967), Count Sumarokov-Elston, Russian aristocrat and one of the participants in the murder of Grigori Rasputin
  - Irina Yusupova (1915–1993), Russian Princess and daughter of Count Felix Yusupov
  - Zinaida Nikolaevna Yusupova (1861–1939), Russian Princess and mother of Count Felix Yusupov
- Aliya Yusupova (born 1984), Kazakhstan gymnast
- Artur Yusupov (born 1960), Russian chess grandmaster
- Beder Yusupova (1901–1969), Soviet Bashkiria actress, teacher
- Benjamin Yusupov (born 1962), Israeli composer
- Ibroyim Yusupov (1929–2008), Karakalpak poet, playwright, translator and teacher
- Iosef Yusupov (born 1955), American and Uzbek set designer
- Ismail Yusupov (1913–2005), Kazakhstan politician
- Iraida Yusupova (born 1962), Turkmenistan composer
- Lidia Yusupova (born 1961), Russian-Chechen human rights activist
- Toʻti Yusupova (1880–2015), Russian Empire and Uzbek longevity claimant
