= Princess Tatiana =

Princess Tatiana may refer to:

- Princess Tatiana Vasilievna Yusupova (1769–1841)
- Princess Tatiana Alexandrovna Yusupova (1829–1879)
- Princess Tatiana Constantinovna of Russia (1890–1979)
- Princess Tatiana von Metternich-Winneburg (1915–2006)
- Princess Tatiana Radziwiłł (born 1939)
- Princess Tatiana von Fürstenberg (born 1971)
- Princess Tatiana of Greece and Denmark (born 1980)
- Princess Tatiana Galitzine (born 1984)
