= Joseph Maria Anton Brassier de Saint-Simon-Vallade =

German diplomat (1798–1872)

Count Joseph Maria Anton Brassier de Saint-Simon-Vallade
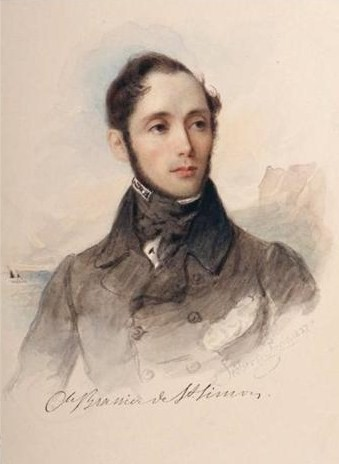
- Portrait of the Count by Friedrich Julius Ludwig Sebbers, 1837

Ambassador of the North German Confederation to the Kingdom of Italy
- In office 1869–1872
- Preceded by: Guido von Usedom
- Succeeded by: Robert von Keudell

Personal details
- Born: 8 August 1798 Brixlegg, Tyrol
- Died: 22 October 1872 (aged 74) Florence, Kingdom of Italy
- Spouse: Countess Marie de Ribeaupierre (m. 1848; died 1872)
- Parent(s): Marie Louis Joseph Brassier de Saint-Simon-Vallade; Louise von Stampfer

Count Joseph Maria Anton Brassier de Saint-Simon-Vallade (8 August 1798 – 22 October 1872) was a Prussian diplomat.

== Early life ==
Brassier de Saint-Simon-Vallade was born in Brixlegg, Tyrol to a French noble family that emigrated to Germany during the French Revolution. His parents were the Privy Councilor Marie Louis Joseph Brassier de Saint-Simon-Vallade, who was born in Strasbourg, and his wife Louise von Stampfer.

His paternal grandparents were Louis Bernard de Brassier, seigneur de Saint Simon et de Vallade and Madeleine de Brassier. His maternal grandparents were Frédéric de Strampfer and Marguerite d'Anselme.

He attended school in Züllichau (in eastern Brandenburg) and graduated from high school in June 1818.

== Career ==
From 1819 to 1820, he served in the Prussian Army as a one-year volunteer. At the same time, he studied law and literature at the Friedrich-Wilhelm University in Berlin and the Ruprecht-Karl University in Heidelberg. In December 1820, he and ten other students founded the Corps Saxo-Borussia Heidelberg. He passed the auscultator (trainee lawyer) examination in April 1822 and was awarded a doctorate in the same year. After he passed the traineeship exam in November 1823, he was called up to the Prussian Foreign Service in May 1824. He initially served as an attaché in the Ministry of Foreign Affairs.

From October 1826 to the spring of 1827 he was temporarily employed at the German embassy in Saint Petersburg before passing his diplomatic examination in October 1827. As Legation secretary he came to the embassy in Lisbon at the beginning of 1828 and to the embassy in Istanbul in 1829. Temporarily its acting head, he was involved in the Treaty of Adrianople in 1829. In December 1832 he was given the status of Legation councilor. From July 1833 to the beginning of 1838 he was Secretary of legation at the embassy in Paris.

After temporary working in the Ministry of Foreign Affairs, he took up the new post of Resident Minister in Athens in November 1838 before being appointed envoy on 16 January 1842. In 1844 he took over as Prussian envoy to Sweden in Stockholm. In November 1854 he took up his post as envoy to the Kingdom of Sardinia in Turin. In December 1862 he was transferred back to Constantinople and became envoy in 1862. In March 1869, he returned to Italy, this time in Florence as envoy of the North German Confederation to the Kingdom of Italy before relocating to Rome in 1871. The handover of the letter of credentials as the first envoy of the German Empire took place on 7 March 1871. He served in this role until his death in Rome in October 1872.

== Personal life ==
On 6 June 1848, he married Marie Alexanrovna, Comtesse de Ribeaupierre (1816–1885), a native Russian who was a daughter of Count Aleksandr Ivanovich Ribeaupierre, a diplomat and chief chamberlain, and Ekaterina Mikhailovna Potemkina. (Note: Ekaterina Mikhailovna Ribeaupierre (1788-1872), a daughter of Lt.-Gen. Mikhail Sergeevich Potemkin (1744-1791) and Tatiana Vasilievna Engelhardt (a niece of Grigory Potemkin), was named after her godmother Catherine the Great. Not long after her birth, her father died, and her mother remarried Nikolai Yusupov in 1793.) Among her siblings were Princess Tatiana Alexandrovna Yusupova. In 1857 Brassier was elevated to the rank of count by the Prussian King Frederick William IV.

Count Brassier de Saint-Simon-Vallade died on 22 October 1872 in Florence.

== Sources ==
- "Брассье-де-Сен-Симон-Валлад, Мария-Иосиф-Антон" . Brockhaus and Efron Encyclopedic Dictionary (in Russian). 1906.

Diplomatic posts
Preceded by Friedrich Wilhelm Ludwig August von Lusi	Prussian Envoy to Greece; 1838–1844	Succeeded by Karl von Werther
Preceded by Ferdinand von Galen	Prussian Envoy to Sweden; 1845–1854	Succeeded by Otto Franz von Westphalen
Preceded by Heinrich Alexander von Redern	Prussian Envoy to Envoy to the Kingdom of Sardinia; 1854–1862	Succeeded by Guido von Usedom (as Ambassador to Italy)
Preceded by Robert Heinrich Ludwig von der Goltz	Prussian Envoy to the Ottoman Empire; 1862–1869	Succeeded by Heinrich von Keyserlingk-Rautenburg (as Ambassador of the North German Confederation)
Preceded by Guido von Usedom	Ambassador of the North German Confederation to the Kingdom of Italy; 1869–1872	Succeeded by Robert von Keudell
