= House of Yusupov =

Russian noble family

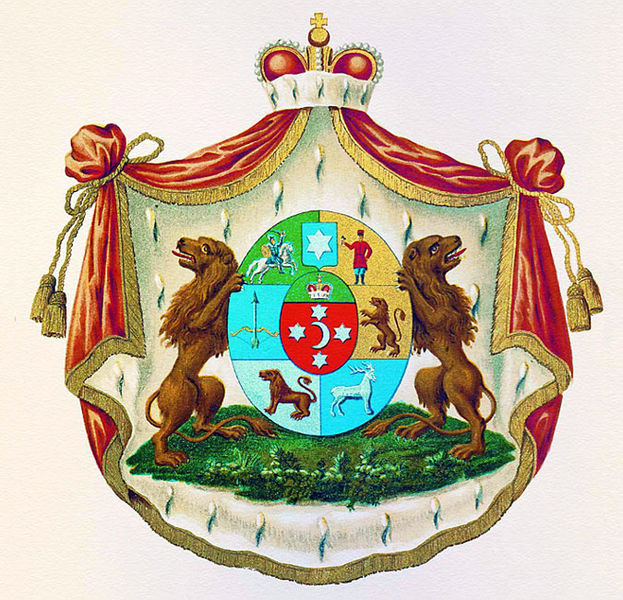
- Coat of arms of the House of Yusupov
- Parent house: Nogais
- Country: Nogai Horde; Russian Empire; France
- Founded: 1600s
- Founder: Dmitry Seyushevich Yusupov (Abdul Mirza)
- Final head: Zinaida Yusupova
- Dissolution: November 24, 1939 (agnatic line ended with Zinaida Yusupova)
- Branches: Sumarokov-Elston-Yusupov (cognatic line)

The House of Yusupov (Russian: Юсу́повы, romanized: Yusupovy) was a Russian princely family descended from Tatar monarchs. Most notably, Prince Felix Yusupov was famous for his involvement in the murder of Grigori Rasputin.

== Early history ==
In the 16th century, Yusuf was the ruler of the Nogai Horde who allied himself with Tsar Ivan the Terrible, but the allies eventually became enemies. Yusuf's daughter Söyembikä was Queen of Kazan, and when Kazan was razed by Ivan, she was taken as prisoner to Moscow. After Yusuf died, another period of fighting between his descendants followed until the 17th century, when Abdul Mirza, another descendant, converted from Islam to Eastern Orthodox Christianity under the name of Dmitry. After the conversion, Tsar Feodor I bestowed upon him the title of Prince Yusupov. His descendant Prince Grigori Dmitrievich Yusupov (17 November 1676, Moscow - 2 September 1730, Moscow), General in Chief and Minister of Defence, was a friend of Peter the Great and helped him with the construction of the Russian Navy. In 1720 he was given a fief, the country estate and manor house in Rakityansky District, formerly owned by Ivan Mazepa. He married Anna Nikitichna Akinfova (died 1735), daughter of Okolnichi Nikita Ivanovich Akinfov. The couple had, besides Boris, three more children:

- Grigori Grigorievich Yusupov (died 1737), Colonel, married firstly to Princess Maria Petrovna Korkodinova, and married secondly to Princess Yevdokia Nikolaievna Shahovskaya, without any issue from both marriages
- Sergei Grigorievich Yusupov (died 1734), Subcolonel, unmarried and without any issue
- Maria Grigorievna Yusupova (died 1738), Lady-in-Waiting at the Court of Empress Catherine I, forced to take monastic vows by her elder brothers in order to inherit her part of family estates, unmarried and without any issue

== 18th and 19th centuries ==
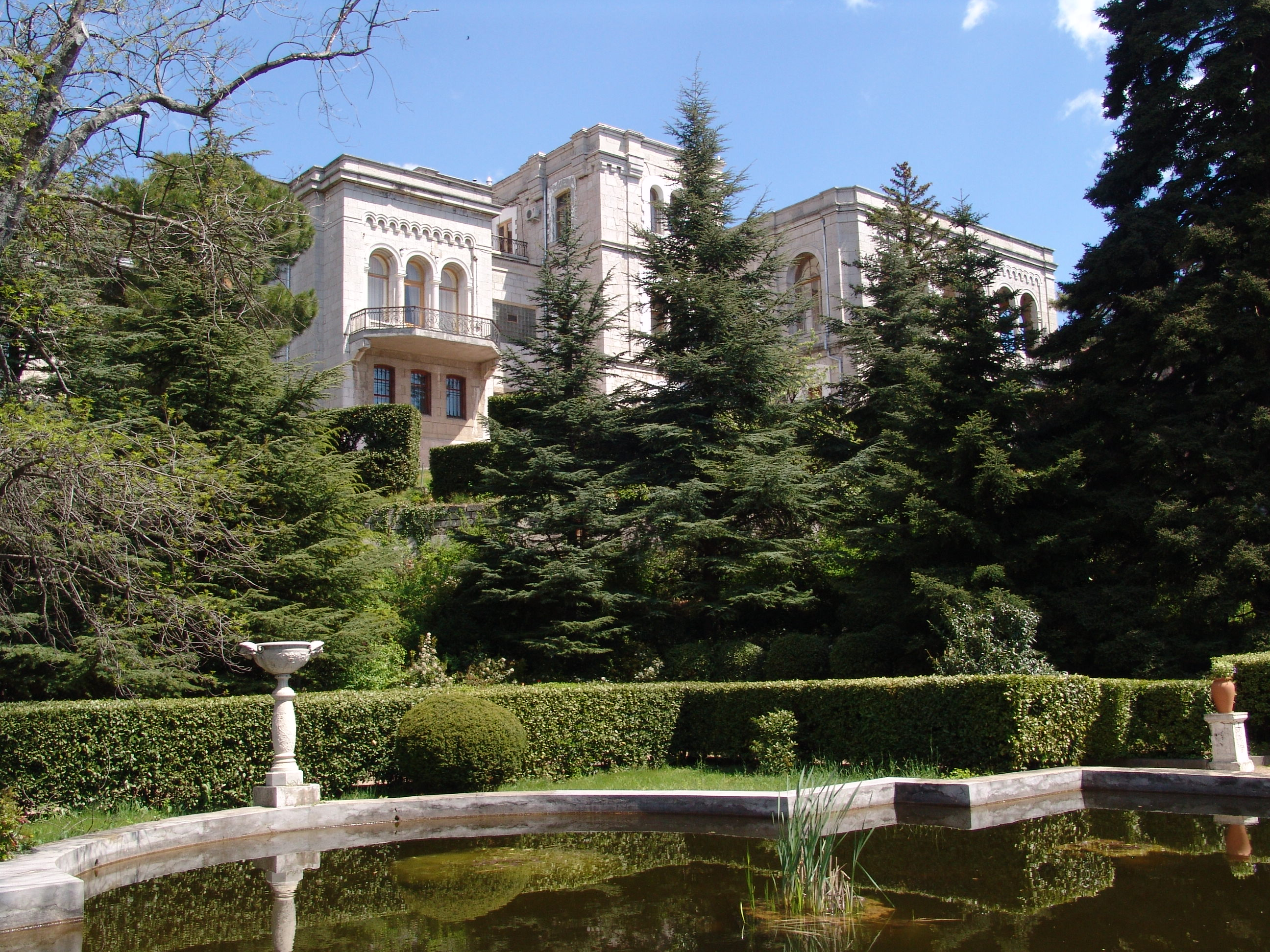
The Yusupov Palace in Koreiz

Prince Boris Grigorievich Yusupov, Chamberlain in 1730, General Governor of Moscow in 1738, Senator (18 June 1695, Moscow – 3 March 1759, Moscow), son of Prince Grigori, was sent to study with the French Navy at the age of 20. He soon became the Tsar's advisor, and eventually served three sovereigns. During the reign of Empress Elizabeth, he was appointed head of the Imperial Schools. In 1756, he encouraged the Empress to form the first Public Theatre in Saint Petersburg. He married Irina Mikhailovna Zinovyeva (1718 – 25 March 1788), daughter of Steward Mikhail Petrovich Zinoviev, in 1734. Besides their only male child, the youngest, she also gave birth to four daughters:

- Yevdokiya Borisovna Yusupova (5 May (NS: 16 May) 1743, Moscow – 19 July (NS: 8 July) 1780, Saint Petersburg), married on 6 March 1774, Mitava (Mittau) (divorced in 1777 or 1778), as his second wife, to Peter von Biron, the last Duke of Kurland (1769–1795) and the first Duke of Sagan (1786–1795) (15 February 1724, Mitava (Mittau) – 13 January 1800, Schloss Gellenau), without offspring
- Alexandra Borisovna Yusupova (1744–1791), married to Senator Ivan Mikhailovich Izmailov (30 January 1724 – 10 November 1787)
- Elisaveta Borisovna Yusupova (27 April 1745 – 29 August 1770), married on 13 February 1764 to General-Major Prince Andrei Mikhailovich Galitzine (15 August 1729 – 23 February 1770), with offspring
- Anna Borisovna Yusupova (1749–1772), married in 1771 to Alexander Yakovlevich Protasov (1742 – 27 April 1799), Chamberlain, Senator, Tutor of Alexander I

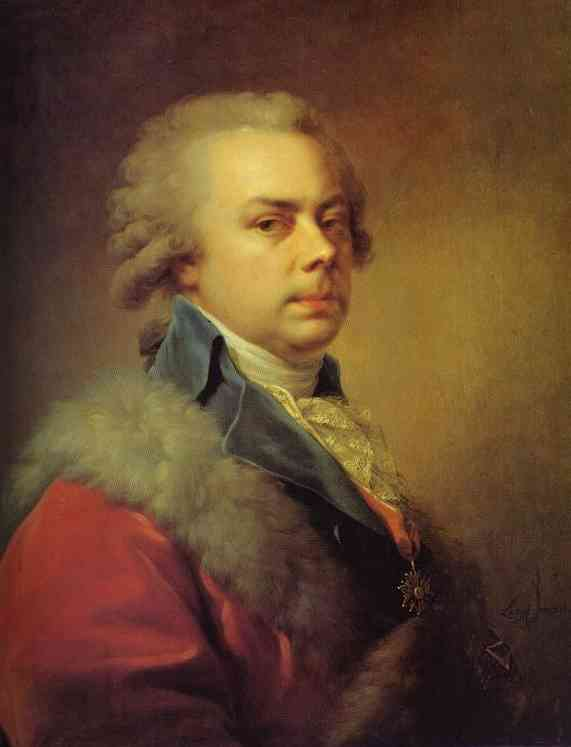
Prince Nikolai Yusupov Sr.

Boris's eldest son, Prince Nikolai Borisovich Yusupov (1751–1831), Senator, Minister of State Properties and Director of the Imperial Theatres, was a keen traveller who spoke five languages and was also a patron of the arts. Nicholas served under a series of sovereigns – including Catherine the Great, Paul I and Alexander I – as a private councillor and diplomat. As a diplomat, Nikolai travelled throughout Europe – to France and Versailles, where he met Louis XVI and Marie Antoinette, to Germany and Prussia, where he met Frederick the Great, to Austria, where he met Emperor Joseph II, and to Italy. During his journey, he purchased a large collection of art for the Tsar and was later appointed director of the Hermitage and the Kremlin Armoury. In 1804, Nicholas went to Paris and frequently met Napoleon I, who presented him with a gift of three large tapestries. In 1793, Nikolai married Tatiana Vasilievna von Engelhardt (1 January 1769 – 23 May 1841), one of Prince Potemkin's nieces. The couple lived together in Arkhangelskoye Estate, their luxurious summer residence near Moscow. Nicholas built his own porcelain factory there, with much of the workers coming from France. In 1831, Nicholas died at the age of 80 and was succeeded by his second and only living son, Boris, since his elder son, Nikolai, died in infancy.

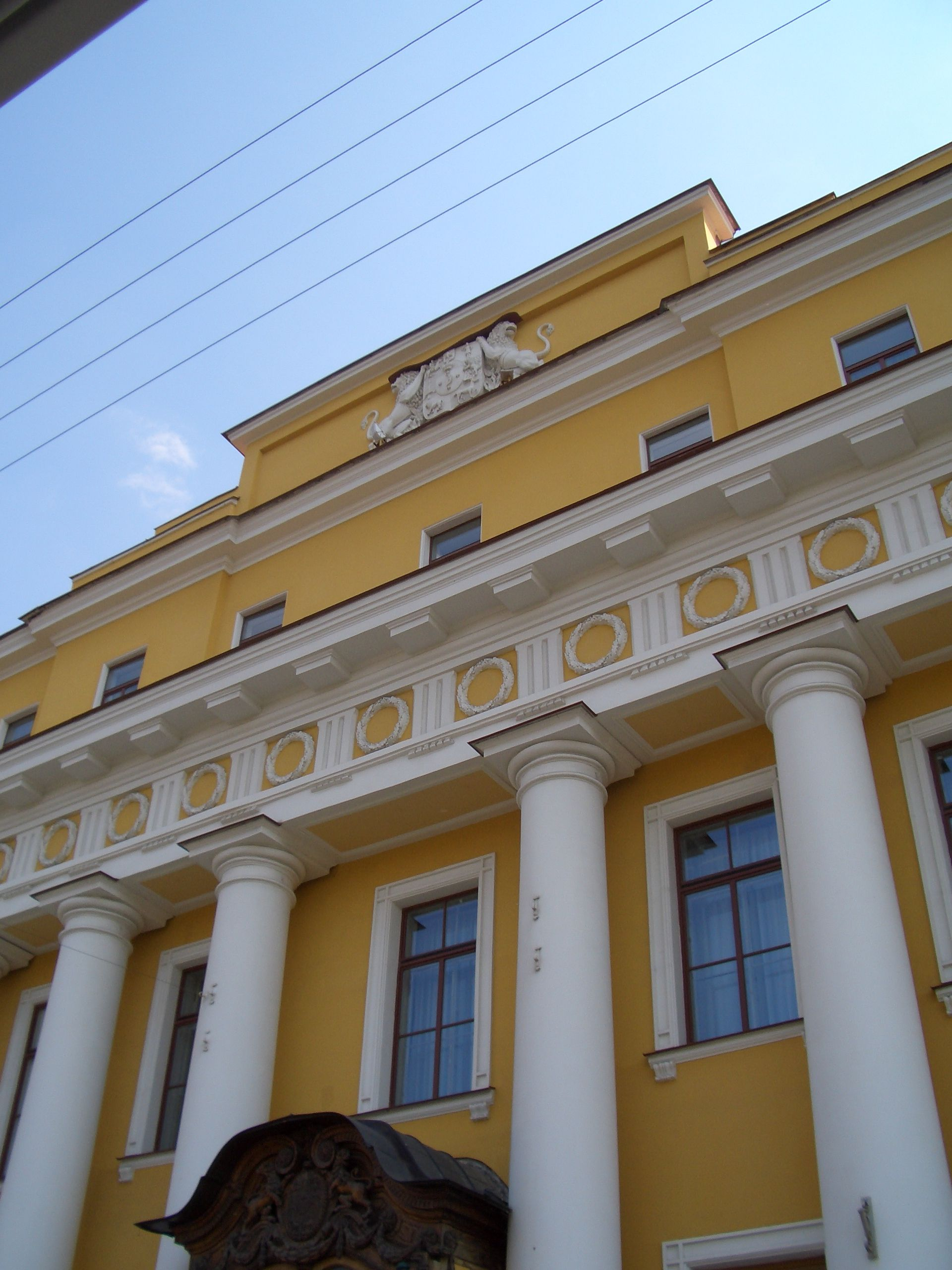
The Moika Palace

At the age of 42, Prince Boris Nikolaievich Yusupov (9 June 1794, Moscow – 25 October 1849, Arkhangelskoye Estate), Marshal of the Imperial Court, inherited his immense family wealth, including more than 675,000 acres (2730 km^{2}) of land and more than 40,000 serfs living on it. But unlike his father, Boris was not a patron of the arts. Instead, he was primarily occupied with business concerns. Boris moved to the Moika Palace in St. Petersburg (also known as Yusupov Palace) with his second wife, Zenaida Ivanovna Narishkina (18 May 1810 – 26 February 1893), a descendant of the same house as Peter the Great's mother, and their only son, Nikolai. The Arkhangelskoye palace was soon derelict; the animals in the palace zoo were sold and much of the collection moved. Boris focused on the family granaries and developed good relationships with the peasants who worked in them. He died in 1849.

Boris's only son, Prince Nikolai Borisovich Yusupov (12 October 1827, Moscow – 31 July 1891, Baden-Baden), Marshal of the Imperial Court, was much like his uncle Nicholas I, a patron of the arts. He first served in Nicholas's chancery. Nikolai bought a large collection of jewellery, including a 36 carat (7.2 g) diamond known as the Morocco Sultan. The prince later spent much of his time in Southern Europe due to poor health, while also serving the Tsar as a diplomat. While in Europe, he bought much to adorn his palace on the Moika, including collections of violins and paintings. He married Countess Tatiana Alexandrovna de Ribeaupierre (29 June 1828 – 14 January 1879), a lady-in-waiting to the Empress, daughter of Comte Alexandre de Ribeaupierre and his wife Ekaterina Mikhailovna Potemkina, another niece of Prince Potemkin. The prince was also a talented musician and composer, and he was a member of several musical societies. In 1866, he published a book about Yusupov family history, On the Family of the Yusupov Princes: A Collection of Their Life Stories, Charters and Letters of the Russian Sovereigns to Them.

== 20th century ==
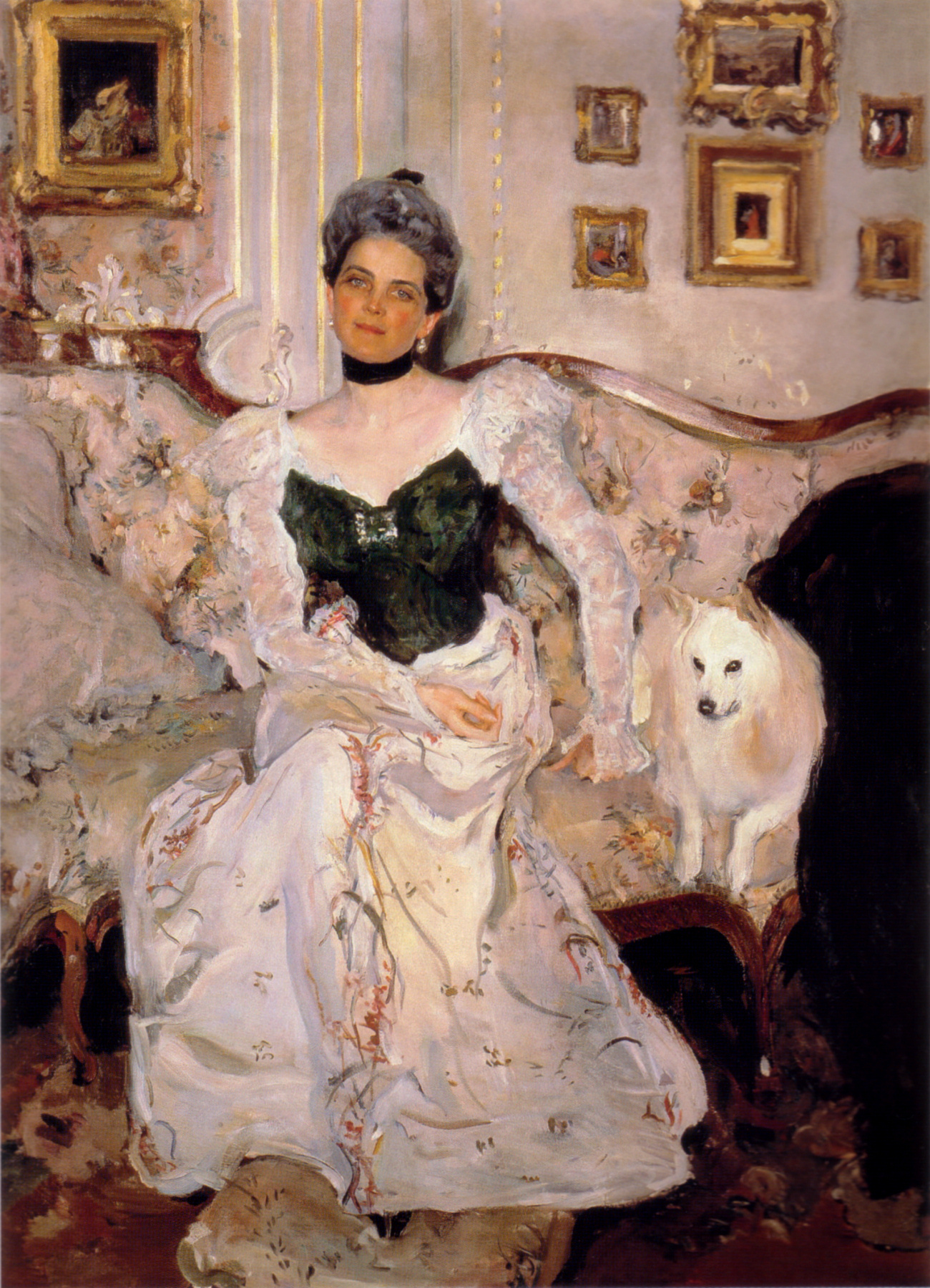
Princess Zinaida Yusupova

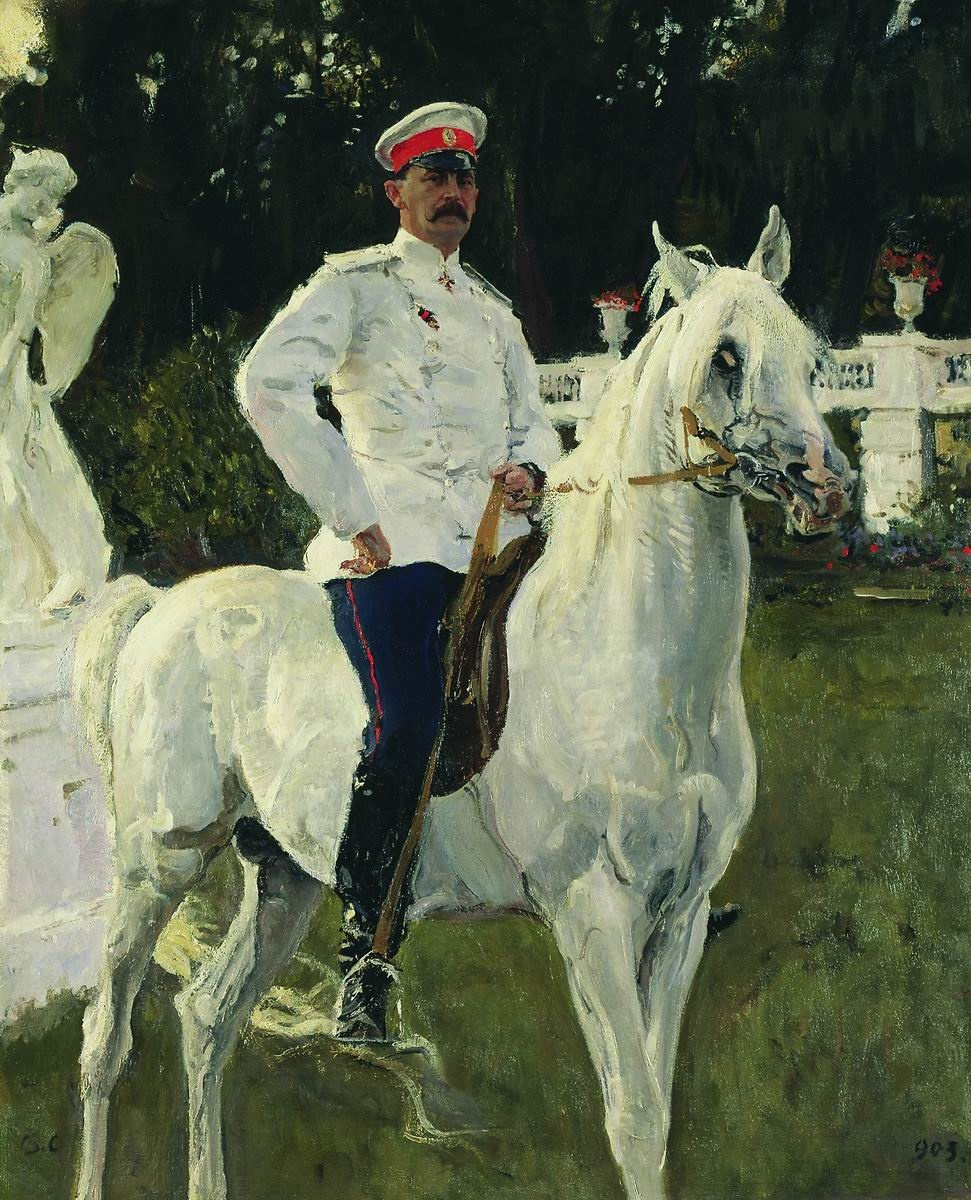
Count Felix Sumarokov-Elston

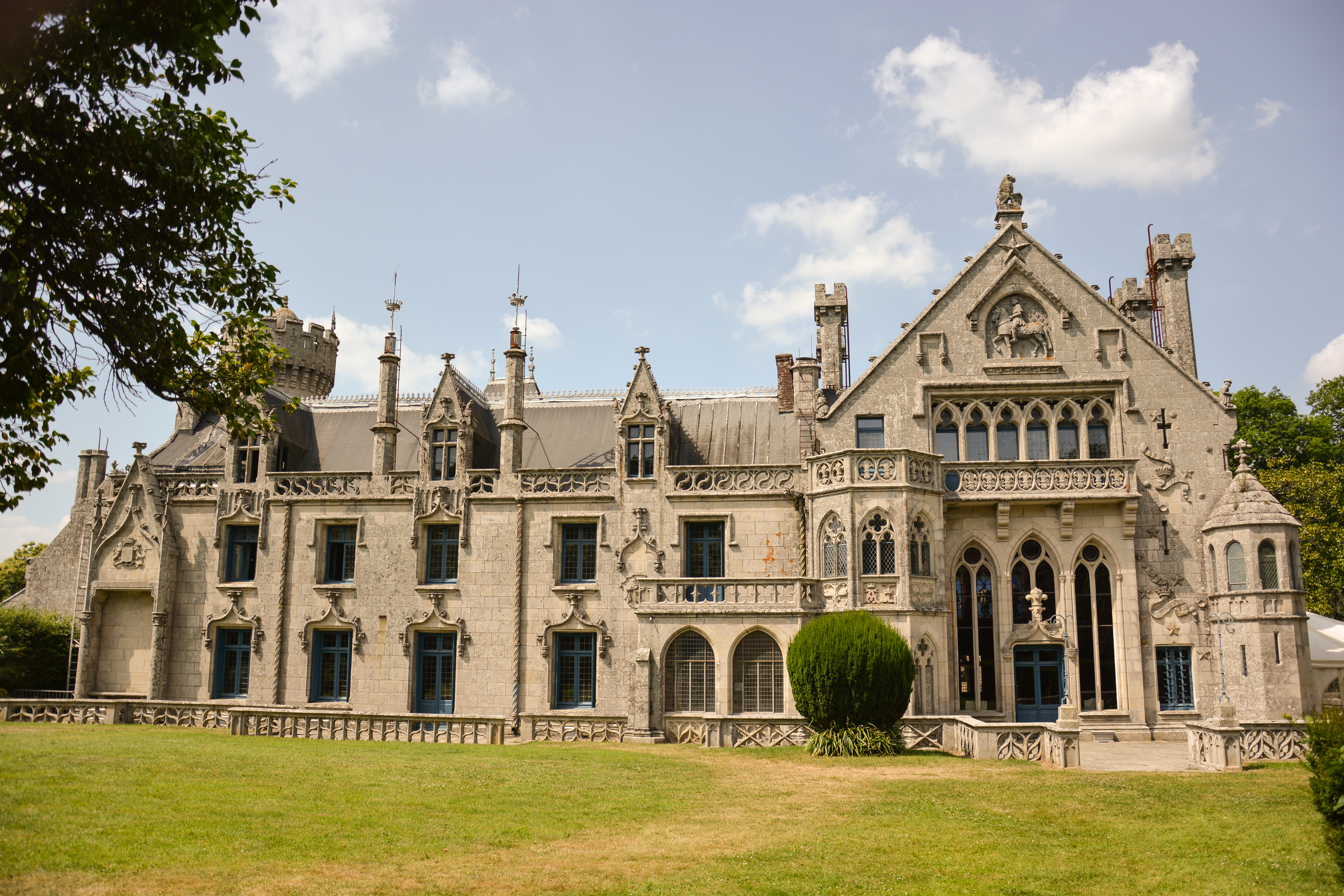
Château de Kériolet in France

When Nicholas Yusupov died in 1891, he was succeeded by his daughter, Zinaida, who was considered a legendary beauty at the time, as well as one of the richest women in the country. Her suitors included the crown prince of Bulgaria. Princess Zinaida Nikolaievna Yusupova (2 September 1861, Saint Petersburg – 24 November 1939, Paris) married Count Felix Felixovich Sumarokov-Elston (5 October 1856, Saint Petersburg – 10 June 1928, Rome), General-Governor of Moscow Military District (1915), son of Count Felix Nikolaievich Sumarokov-Elston. Their wedding took place on 4 April 1882 in Saint Petersburg.

After his father-in-law died, Felix was granted special permission from Tsar Alexander III to carry the title Prince Yusupov and Count Sumarokov-Elston and to pass it to his and Zinaida's heir. Felix was appointed adjutant to Grand Duke Sergei Alexandrovich in 1904 and commanded the cavalry of the Imperial Guards.

At the beginning of World War I, the Yusupovs owned more than 100,000 acres (400 km^{2}) of land and their industries included sugarbeet factories, brick plants, saw-mills, textile and cardboard factories, mines and distilleries, in addition to more than 16 palaces and estates.

The Yusupovs left an imprint on the economic and social development of Rakitnoe. They owned mechanical and agricultural shops, enterprises for tanning sheepskin, cloth, lace and two carpet factories, wind and mechanical mills, forges, parochial schools and railways, a district hospital, houses in the village and Rakitno GEST at the railway junction, the palace complex with a grand park and three cascading ponds, the Church of the Assumption and St. Nicholas Church in the village Rakitno. They paved roads, and a railway station was built.

The elder son of Zinaida and Felix, Nikolay Felixovich Yusupov (1883–1908), was killed in a duel at the age of 25. Felix Yusupov was the younger son of Zinaida and Felix. He is famous for his involvement in the murder of Grigori Rasputin. Felix Yusupov married Princess Irina, niece of the last Russian Tsar, Nicholas II, and a great-granddaughter of King Christian IX. After the murder of Rasputin, he was exiled to the Crimea, but he returned to St. Petersburg in 1917 to find the city in massive disorder after the February Revolution. He took with him some of his most precious paintings by Rembrandt and jewellery.

In April 1919, he left Russia for Paris, never to return. His daughter, Irina, married Count Sheremetev's descendant. They moved to Greece with their children, although recently they were granted Russian citizenship by the Russian President. Princess Irina Felixovna Yusupova died on 30 August 1983 at Cormeilles in France. She was buried alongside her paternal grandparents and her parents at Sainte-Geneviève-des-Bois Russian Cemetery in Essonne, France.

== See also ==
- Arkhangelskoye Palace (near Moscow)
- Moika Palace (in Saint Petersburg)
- Yusupov Palace (Crimea)

== Sources ==
- Lost Splendor - Yusupov's self-biography until 1919 (online). Printed in 1952, ISBN 1-885586-58-2.
