= Zinaida Yusupova =

Russian princess (1861–1939)

Princess Zinaida Yusupova
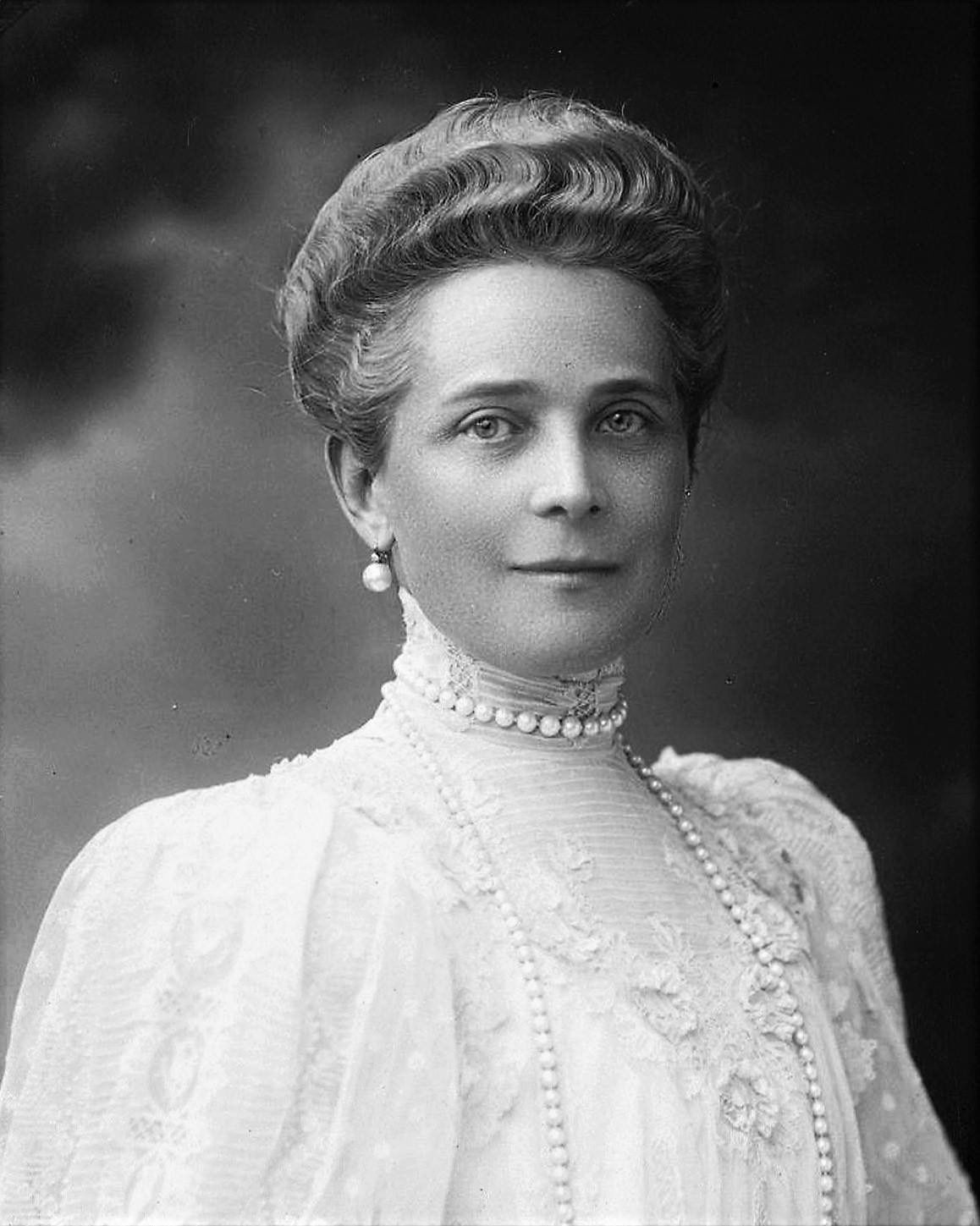
- Full name: Zinaida Nikolayevna Yusupova
- Born: 2 September 1861; Moscow, Russian Empire
- Died: 24 November 1939 (aged 78); Paris, France
- Noble family: Yusupov
- Spouse: Count Felix Sumarokov-Elston (m. 1882; died 1928)
- Issue: Prince Nicholas Felixovich Yusupov; Prince Felix Felixovich Yusupov
- Father: Prince Nicholas Borisovich Yusupov
- Mother: Countess Tatiana Alexandrovna de Ribeaupierre

Princess Zinaida Nikolaevna Yusupova (Russian: Зинаи́да Никола́евна Юсу́пова; 2 September 1861 – 24 November 1939) was a Russian noblewoman, the only heiress of Russia's largest private fortune of her time. Famed for her beauty, the lavishness of her hospitality, and her extensive charity, she was a leading figure in pre-Revolutionary Russian society. In 1882, she married Count Felix Felixovich Sumarokov-Elston, who served briefly as General Governor of Moscow Military District (1914–1915). Zinaida is best known as the mother of Prince Felix Yusupov, the murderer of Grigori Rasputin. In April 1919 she left Russia and spent her remaining years living in exile.

== Early life ==
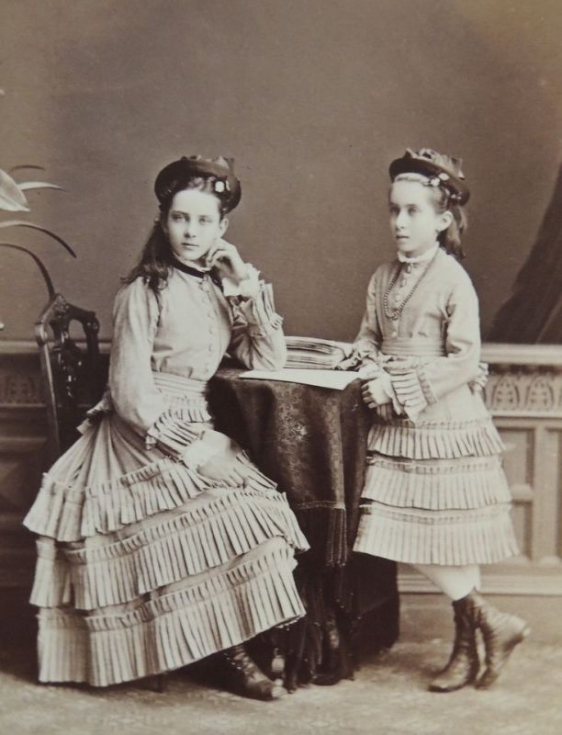
Zinaida as a child with her younger sister Tatiana

Princess Zinaida Nikolaevna Yusupova was the only surviving child of Prince Nicholas Borisovich Yusupov (12 October 1827 – 31 July 1891), Marshal of the Imperial Court, and Countess Tatiana Alexandrovna de Ribeaupierre (29 June 1828 – 14 January 1879). Prince Yusupov was a patron of the arts and served in the chancery of Tsar Nicholas I. Zinaida's mother, a lady-in-waiting to the Empress Alexandra Feodorovna, was the daughter of Count Alexander Ivanovich de Ribeaupierre and his wife Ekaterina Mikhailovna Potemkina, a niece of Prince Potemkin.

Princess Zinaida's only brother, Prince Boris Nikolaevich Yusupov, died in early childhood. She also had a younger sister, Princess Tatiana Nikolaevna. As the only surviving child of a distinguished, highly placed, and vastly rich couple, Zinaida enjoyed great favour at court. She was the greatest Russian heiress of her time, and the last of her line; the House of Yusupov. The Yusupovs, a family of Tatar-Nogai origin, were very wealthy, having acquired their vast fortune generations earlier. Their properties included four palaces in Saint Petersburg, three palaces in Moscow, 37 estates in different parts of Russia (such as Arkhangelskoye, Kursk, Voronezh, and Poltava). They owned more than 100.000 acres (400 km^{2}) of land and their industries included sugar beet factories, brick plants, sawmills, textile and cardboard factories, iron-ore mines, flour mills, distilleries, and oil fields on the Caspian Sea.

Princess Zinaida was known for being intelligent, hospitable, socially skilled, and beautiful; qualities that would last late into her life.

== Marriage ==
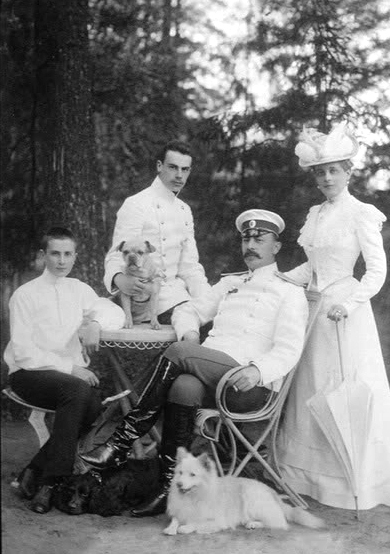
The Yusupov family in 1902, from left to right: Prince Felix, Prince Nicholas, Count Felix Felixovich Sumarokov-Elston, and Princess Zinaida

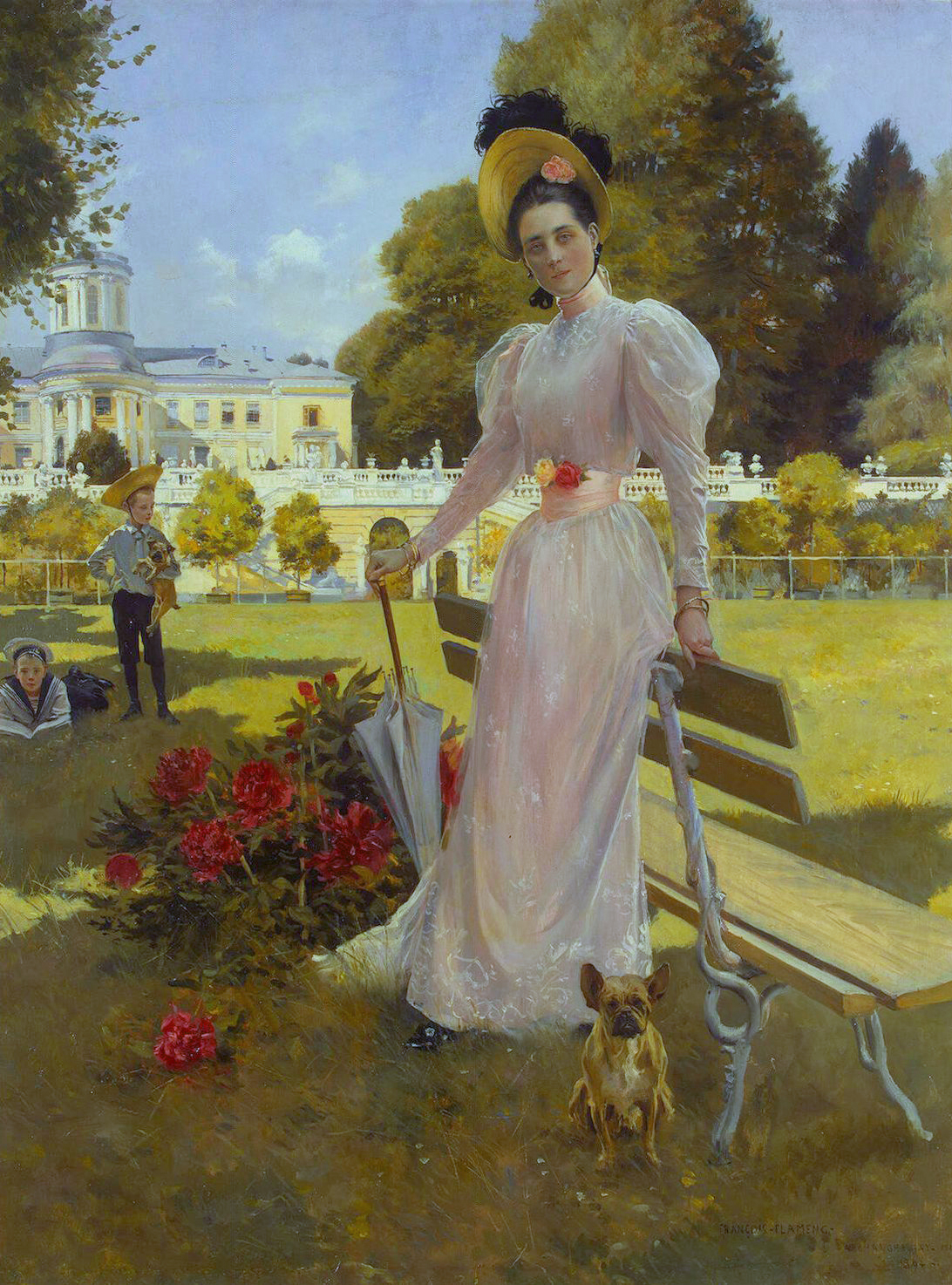
Portrait of Princess Zinaida Yusupova with her sons in her Arkhangelskoye estate by François Flameng, 1894

Prince Nicholas Borisovich Yusupov was hoping that Zinaida would make an illustrious marriage, but at a reception organised to pair her with Alexander of Battenberg, Zinaida met and fell in love with Count Felix Felixovich Sumarokov-Elston (5 October 1856 – 10 June 1928), a lieutenant in the Horse Guards and son of Count Felix Nikolaevich Sumarokov-Elston. They were married on 4 April 1882 in Saint Petersburg. Princess Zinaida and her husband had four sons, two of whom survived childhood: Prince Nicholas Felixovich Yusupov (1883-1908) and Prince Felix Felixovich Yusupov (1887-1967). After his father-in-law died in 1891 Felix was granted special permission by Tsar Alexander III to carry the title Prince Yusupov as well as that of Count Sumarokov-Elston and to pass them both to his and Zinaida's heir. Prince Felix was appointed adjutant to the Grand Duke Sergei Alexandrovich in 1904 and commanded the Cavalry of the Imperial Guards. In 1914 he was appointed Governor General of Moscow, a position he held briefly.

Aside from the grand Moika Palace (also known as Yusupov Palace) in Saint Petersburg and their many estates, the couple also had a mansion in Liteyny Avenue, where the Saint Petersburg Institute of International Trade, Economics, and Law is currently located. She owned the palace at Nevsky Prospect 86 as well.

== Socialite and charity ==
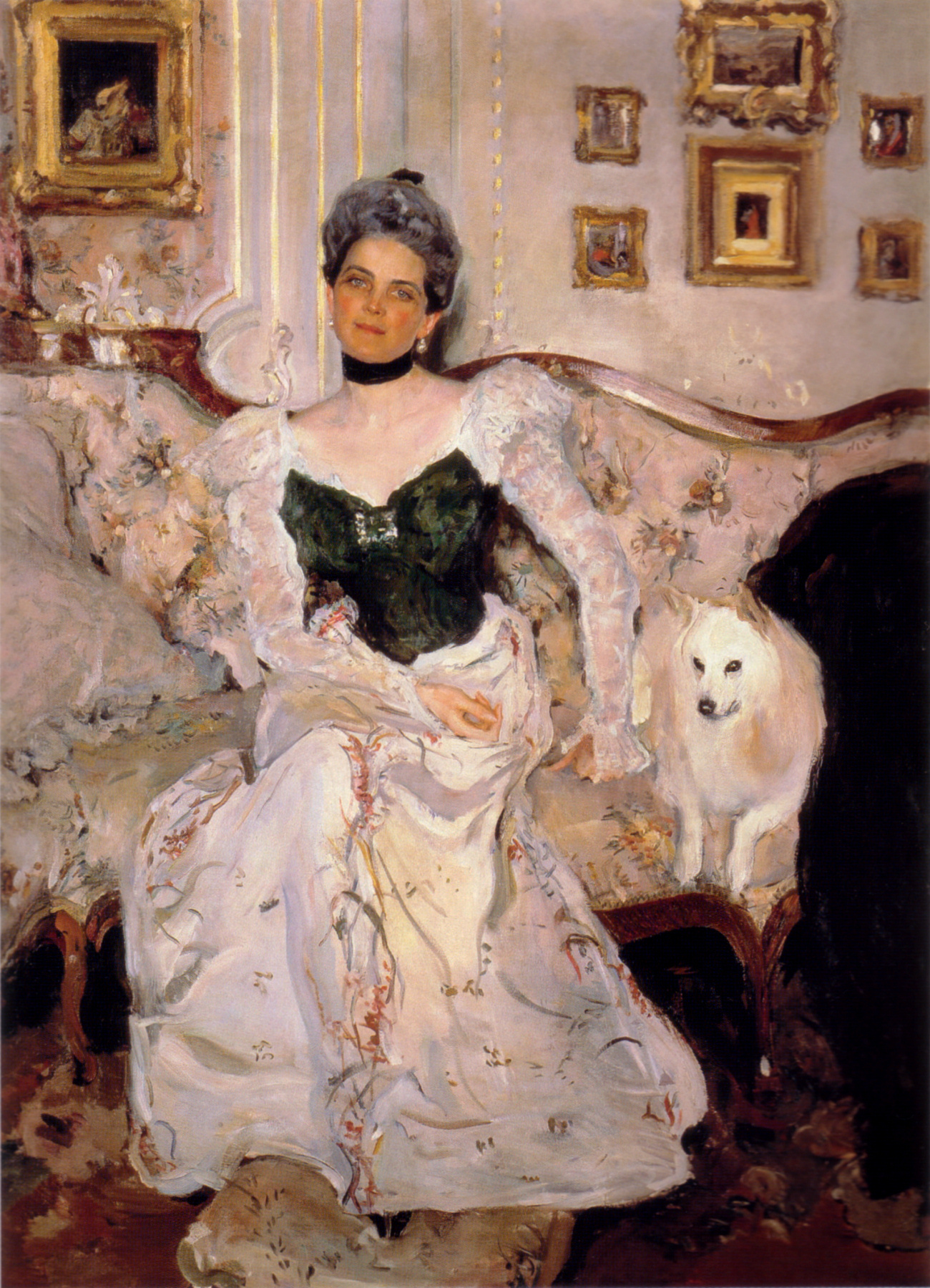
Portrait by Valentin Serov, c. 1902

As a leading figure in pre-Revolutionary Russian society, Zinaida was famed for her beauty, elegance and the lavishness of her hospitality. In her book of memoirs, Ladies of the Russian Court, Meriel Buchanan (1886-1959), daughter of the last British ambassador to Imperial Russia, described Princess Zinaida as:

'Delicate in health, easily exhausted, essentially feminine, she was not one of those capable, competent women, able to run big charitable organisations. She was always ready to give, freely and generously, to anyone who appealed to her, to do what she could to help anyone in distress, to lend her name, her house, her resources for any worthy cause, but she shrank from publicity, from all the complications of executive administration.'

Zinaida Yusupova was also known for her generosity; at Arkhangelskoye, she built schools, hospitals, houses, a church, and even a theatre, all for the use of her servants and those who lived on the estate, and she took a great interest in their lives. Her son Felix later recalled that no one who ever came to her with a request or favor was ever turned away, and her generosity won her many admirers. Her friendship with the Grand Duchess Elizabeth Feodorovna, based on their mutual charity and faith, no doubt inspired Elizabeth to dedicate herself solely to the Church and the poor. 'If all rich people, Princess, were like you, there would be no room for injustice,’ the painter Valentin Serov, who disliked the powerful and flattered no one, told her. ‘Injustice cannot be eradicated, and especially not with money, Valentin Alexandrovich,’ replied the ‘glorious’ Princess (as Serov called her in a letter to his wife). Even when living modestly in exile she participated in charity, mainly supporting Russian refugees. She, for example, established an agency in Rome that found work for emigrants, donated money to those who wanted to learn a profession, and opened sewing workshops and free cafeterias for fellow Russian refugees.

Princess Zinaida Yusupova served as lady-in-waiting to both Empress Maria Feodorovna and later Empress Alexandra Feodorovna. She was a friend of Grand Duchess Elizabeth Feodorovna, wife of Grand Duke Sergei Alexandrovich. In private, she became a severe critic of Empress Alexandra, Elizabeth's sister. Zinaida's eldest son, Nicholas, was killed in a duel in 1908 at the age of 25, an event which cast a shadow over the rest of her life. In February 1914, Zinaida's younger son, Felix, married Princess Irina Alexandrovna, Tsar Nicholas II's only niece and a great-granddaughter of Christian IX of Denmark. Felix fell from grace for participating in the murder of Grigori Rasputin; Empress Alexandra wanted him shot immediately, but this was not carried out. His mother supported his actions, seeing Rasputin's death as vital for the situation in Russia to improve, as the reputations of the Tsar and Empress had been damaged by Rasputin's apparent influence over them, an opinion most of the aristocracy shared, such as the Tsar's mother the Dowager Empress Maria Feodorovna and the Empress's sister, Grand Duchess Elizabeth Feodorovna. Felix Yusupov then moved to his estate in the Crimea, accompanied by his family.

== Revolution and exile ==
In 1917, as the Russian Empire fell into revolution and the Tsar abdicated, the Yusupovs returned to the city, but the unrest and violence was too much for Zinaida, and they returned to the Crimea. The chaos brought about was expected to end soon; most aristocrats expected a reborn Russia. Her son, Felix, was able to return to the city to recover some paintings by Rembrandt and jewels, the rest were hidden, for example, under the staircase of the Yusupov Palace in Moscow. However, following the Bolshevik coup, these hopes were annihilated. Private property was abolished and confiscated; the Yusupovs lost everything: their immense wealth, palaces, estates, jewels, etc. In 1925, the riches concealed under the staircase were found and, like the belongings of the other 'former people' (as former aristocrats were known), sold off.

In April 1919 Princess Zinaida finally left Russia together with 39 Romanovs, including the Dowager Empress. This happened only when the threat of the approaching Bolsheviks was impossible to ignore. She and her husband moved to Rome, where they lived under reduced circumstances. After his death she moved to Paris, living with her son Felix and his wife in an apartment, where she took care of their daughter. Princess Zinaida Yusupova died in 1939 and was buried in the Sainte-Geneviève-des-Bois Russian Cemetery.

== Issue ==
Zinaida and Felix had two sons:

1. Prince Nicholas Felixovich Yusupov (28 February 1883 – 5 July 1908)
2. Prince Felix Felixovich Yusupov (11 March 1887 – 27 September 1967), who married Princess Irina Alexandrovna and had one daughter: Irina 'Bébé' Felixovna Yusupova (21 March 1915 – 30 August 1983), who married Count Nicholas Dmitrievich Sheremetev and had one daughter: Countess Xenia Nikolaevna Sheremeteva (1 March 1942), who married Ilias Sfiris and had one daughter: Tatiana Sfiris (28 August 1968), who married Anthony Vamvakidis and had two daughters: Marilia Vamvakidis (born 7 July 2004) and Yasmine Xenia Vamvakidis (born 17 May 2006)

In 1910, Felix began an affair with his goddaughter, who had been named after his wife. They had three children together, two of which survived infancy.

== Jewel collection ==
As the head of one of the most important noble families in Russia, she also inherited a vast fortune, which meant owning the largest collection of historical jewels in Russia, second only to that of the vaults of the Romanovs. Some of the famous gems were: the mid-16th century La Pelegrina pearl, the 'Polar Star Diamond' (a 41.28 carat diamond), The 'La Régente Pearl' (fifth largest pearl in the world), the 17th century 'Ram’s Head Diamond' (a 17.47-carat diamond), the 17th century 'Sultan of Morocco Diamond' (35.67 carats, fourth largest blue diamond in the world), the 17th century Diamond Earrings of Marie Antoinette' (two 34.59 carat diamonds), the 'Blue Venus Statuette Sapphire' (4-inch-tall sapphire statuette of the goddess Venus atop a large Spinel) and also the 15th century 'Ruby Buddha' (70+ carat ruby statue).

Following her narrow escape during the Russian Revolution, she was forced to leave all her financial assets behind: her jewel collection was hidden beneath a staircase in her Moscow palace in hopes that she would retain their use in her return to Russia. Following the discovery in April 1925 of the concealed vault, an OGPU inventory recorded 13 diadems, 25 necklaces, 42 bracelets, 255 brooches and numerous other ornaments, together with over a ton of silver and 13 kilograms of gold objets d’art. However, the cache was confiscated and the jewels were dispersed by the Soviet state in 1925. During her exile she took only the major jewels and had them sold to fund her family and charity.

== Ancestry ==
Ancestors of Princess Zenaida Nikolaievna Yusupova

16. Prince Boris Grigorievich Yusupov
8. Prince Nikolai Borisovich Yusupov
17. Irina Mikhailovna Zinovyeva
4. Prince Boris Nikolaevich Yusupov
18. Wasilij von Engelhardt (= 30)
9. Tatiana Vasilievna von Engelhardt (= 15)
19. Marfa Yelena Alexandrovna Potyomkina (= 31)
2. Nikolai Borisovich Yusupov
20. Dimitri Ivanovich Narishkin
10. Ivan Dimitrievitch Narishkin, Marshal of the Sytchev Nobility and Chamberlain
21. Princess Praskovia Nikolayevna Dolgorukova
5. Zinaida Ivanovna Yusupova
22. Ivan Nikolajevich Rimsky-Korsakov
11. Varvara Ivanovna Rimskaya-Korsakova
23. Princess Ekaterina Petrovna Trubetskaya
1. Princess Zinaida Nikolaevna Yusupova
24. Count Marc Étienne de Ribeaupierre
12. Count Jean François de Ribeaupierre
25. Jeanne Élisabeth Ducoster
6. Count Alexandre de Ribeaupierre
26. Aleksandr Ilyich Bibikov
13. Agrippina Alexandrovna Bibikova
27. Princess Anastasia Semyonovna Kozlovska
3. Countess Tatiana Alexandrovna de Ribeaupierre
28. Sergei Dmitrievich Potemkin
14. Mikhail Sergeevich Potemkin
29. Princess Anna Mikhailovna Kropotkina
7. Ekaterina Mikhailovna Potemkina
30. Wasilij von Engelhardt (= 18)
15. Tatiana Vasilievna von Engelhardt (= 9)
31. Marfa Yelena Alexandrovna Potyomkina (= 19)

== Bibliography ==
- Buchanan, Meriel. Princess Zenaida Yusopova . Royal Russia. N 4, 2013. ISBN 978-1927604045.
- Papi, Stefano. Jewels of the Romanovs: Family & Court. Thames & Hudson, 2013. ISBN 978-0-500-51706-2
- Youssoupoff, Prince Felix. Lost Splendor: The Amazing Memoirs of the Man Who Killed Rasputin. Turtle Point Press, 2003. ISBN 978-1885586582
