= List of ambassadors of Germany to Italy =

Ambassador of Germany to Italy
- Deutscher Botschafter in Italien

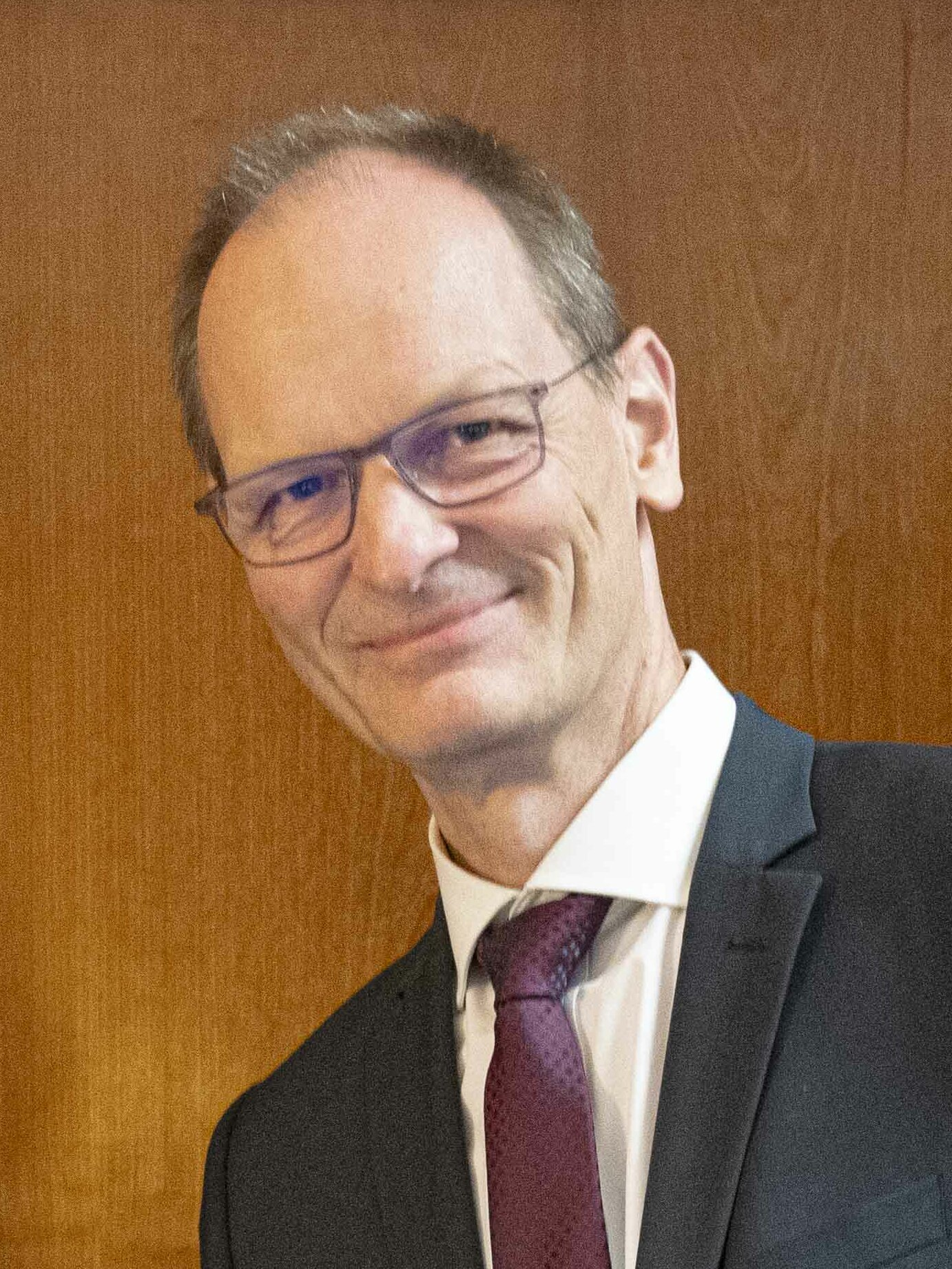
- Incumbent; Thomas Bagger since 2025
- Style: Ambassador
- Residence: Embassy of Germany, Rome
- Inaugural holder: Clemens von Brentano
- Formation: 1 June 1952
- Website: https://italien.diplo.de/

This is an incomplete list of ambassadors from Germany to Italy.

== History ==
The below lists contain the highest-ranking representatives of the North German Confederation (1866–1871), the German Empire (1871–1945) and the Federal Republic of Germany (since 1951) in the Kingdom of Italy (1861–1946) and the Italian Republic (since 1946). The capital of Italy and the official headquarters of the German embassy were Turin (1861–1865), Florence (1865–1870) and Rome (since 1870). The German ambassador in Rome has also been accredited for the Republic of San Marino since 1995.

== Ambassadors ==
Name	Image	Term Start	Term End	Notes
North German Confederation
Guido von Usedom		1868	1869	
Brassier de Saint-Simon-Vallade		1869	1872	
/ / German Empire
Robert von Keudell		1873	1887	
Eberhard zu Solms-Sonnenwalde		1887	1893	
Bernhard von Bülow		1893	1897	
Anton Saurma von der Jeltsch		1897	1899	
Karl von Wedel		1899	1902	
Anton von Monts de Mazin		1903	1909	
Gottlieb von Jagow		1909	1913	
Hans von Flotow		1913	1915	
John von Berenberg-Gossler		1920	1921	
Konstantin von Neurath		1921	1930	
Karl von Schubert		1930	1932	
Ulrich von Hassell		1932	1938	
Hans Georg von Mackensen		1938	1943	
Otto Christian Archibald von Bismarck		August 1942	August 1943	chargé d'affaires
Rudolf Rahn		1943	1945	General representative in Salò
Federal Republic of Germany
Clemens von Brentano		1951	1957	
Manfred Klaiber		1957	1963	
Herbert Blankenhorn		1963	1965	
Hans-Heinrich Herwarth von Bittenfeld		1965	1969	
Rolf Lahr		1969	1973	
Hermann Meyer-Lindenberg		1974	1977	
Hans Arnold		1977	1981	
Rüdiger von Wechmar		1981	1983	
Lothar Lahn		1983	1986	
Friedrich Ruth		1986	1992	
Konrad Seitz		1992	1994	
Dieter Kastrup		1994	1998	
Fritjof von Nordenskjöld		1998	2000	
Klaus Neubert		2001	2004	
Michael H. Gerdts		2004	2007	
Michael Steiner		2007	2010	
Michael H. Gerdts		2010	2012	
Reinhard Schäfers		2012	2015	
Susanne Wasum-Rainer		2015	2018	
Viktor Elbling		2018	2023	
Hans-Dieter Lucas		2023	2025	
Thomas Bagger		2025		

== Envoys from the German States (before 1871) ==
=== Bavarian envoys ===
Name	Image	Term Start	Term End	Notes
1865: Establishment of diplomatic relations
Ferdinand von Hompesch-Bollheim		1865	1868	
Ludwig von Paumgarten-Frauenstein		1868	1870	
Wilhelm von Dönniges		1870	1872	
Alfred Ludwig von Bibra		1872	1880	
Rudolf von Tautphoeus		1880	1885	
Karl Moy de Sons		1886	1887	
Clemens von Podewils-Dürniz		1887	1896	
Heinrich Tucher von Simmelsdorf		1896	1903	
Rudolf von und zu Tann-Rathsamhausen		1903	1915	
1915: Breaking off diplomatic relations
1919: Dissolution of the embassy

=== Prussian envoys ===
==== Envoy to Savoy-Piedmont (until 1720) ====
Name	Image	Term Start	Term End	Notes
16??: Establishment of diplomatic relations
Gottfried von Jena		c. 1665		
François de Langes		c. 1703		

==== Envoy to Sardinia-Piedmont (1720–1862) ====
Name	Image	Term Start	Term End	Notes
Johann Friedrich von Cocceji		c. 1759		
Friedrich von Waldburg-Truchsess		1816	1827	
Friedrich von Martens		1827	1829	
Bogislaw von Maltzahn		1829	1830	Resident in Vienna
August Schoultz von Ascheraden		1830	1832	
Friedrich Ludwig III von Truchsess zu Waldburg		1832	1844	
Heinrich Alexander von Redern		1845	1848	
Georg von Werthern		1848	1850	
Heinrich Alexander von Redern		1850	1854	
Joseph Maria Anton Brassier de Saint-Simon-Vallade		1854	1862	
1862: Recognition of the Kingdom of Italy by Prussia

==== Ambassador at Rome ====
Name	Image	Term Start	Term End	Notes
Barthold Georg Niebuhr		1816	1823	
Christian Charles Josias von Bunsen		1823	1838	

== See also ==
- Italy–Germany relations
