= Irina Yusupova =

Russian aristocrat

Princess Irina Felixovna Yusupova
- Countess Nikolai Dmitrievich Sheremetev
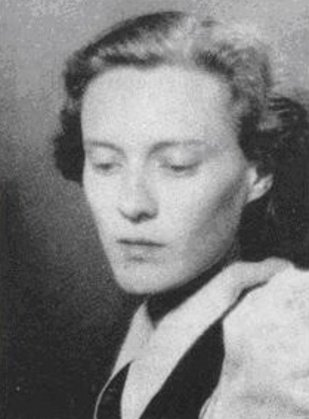
- Princess Irina Felixovna Yusupova, 1935.
- Born: 21 March 1915; Moika Palace, Petrograd, Russian Empire
- Died: 30 August 1983 (aged 68); Cormeilles, France
- Burial: Sainte-Geneviève-des-Bois Russian Cemetery
- Spouse: Count Nikolai Dmitrievich Sheremetev (m. 1938; died 1979)
- Issue: Countess Xenia Nikolaevna Sheremeteva
Names
- Irina Felixovna Yusupova
- House: Yusupov
- Father: Prince Felix Felixovich Yusupov
- Mother: Princess Irina Alexandrovna of Russia

Countess Irina Felixovna Sheremeteva (née Princess Yusupova; Russian: Графиня Ирина Феликсовна Шереметева née Княгиня Юсупова; 21 March 1915, Petrograd, Russian Empire – 30 August 1983), known affectionately as Bébé, was a Russian aristocrat.

== Life ==
=== Early life ===
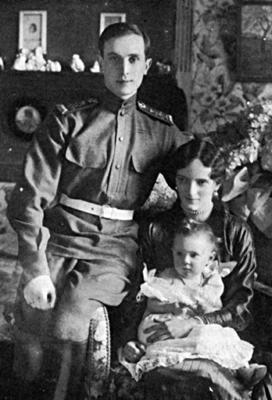
Prince Felix and Princess Irina Alexandrovna Yusupovs with their daughter, Irina Felixovna Yusupova, called "Bébé", in 1916.

Princess Irina was the daughter of Prince Felix, the heir of one of the wealthiest families of Russia and of Europe. Her mother, Princess Irina Alexandrovna of Russia, was the daughter of Grand Duke Alexander Mikhailovich and Grand Duchess Xenia Alexandrovna, the elder daughter of Tsar Alexander III and sister of Tsar Nicholas II. Through her mother's side, she was a descendant of Christian IX of Denmark.

After the February Revolution, the Yusupovs fled Russia and settled in Paris, leaving behind most of their wealth. At first, the little girl was raised by her paternal grandparents until, at the age of nine, they returned the little princess to her parents. According to her father, Prince Felix Yusupov Feliksovitch, his daughter received a poor education causing an alteration in the character of the girl, who became capricious. Princess Irina Felixovna Yusupova was raised by nannies and, whilst she adored her father, she was very distant with her mother.

=== Marriage ===
Princess Irina married on 19 June 1938 in Paris, France, Count Nikolai Dmitrievich Sheremetev (28 October 1904, Moscow, Russia – 5 February 1979, Paris, France), son of Count Dmitri Sergeievich Sheremetev and his wife Countess Irina Ilarionovna Vorontsova-Dashkova. His ancestors include Boris Petrovich Sheremetev and Illarion Ivanovich Vorontsov-Dashkov. He worked with the shipping company, Vlasoff. He later contracted tuberculosis, and they moved to Greece for a climate better suited to his condition.

They had one daughter, Countess Xenia Nikolaevna Sheremeteva, born 1 March 1942 in Rome.

=== Death and burial ===
Princess Irina Felixovna Yusupova died on 30 August 1983 at Cormeilles in France. She was buried alongside her paternal grandparents and her parents at the cemetery Sainte-Geneviève-des-Bois Russian Cemetery in Essonne, France).

== Descendants ==
- Countess Xenia Nikolaevna Sheremeteva (born 1 March 1942, Rome, Italy), married on 20 June 1965 in Athens, Greece, to Ilías Sfyrís (born 20 August 1932, Athens, Greece); had issue:
  - Tatiána Sfyrí (born 28 August 1968, Athens, Greece), married in May 1996 in Athens, Greece, to Aléxios Giannakoúpoulos (born 1963), divorced, no issue; married Antónios Vamvakídis and has issue:
    - Marília Vamvakídi (7 July 2004)
    - Giasmín Xénia Vamvakídi (17 May 2006)

Xenia Sheremeteva provided mitochondrial DNA (mDNA) in the 1990s in order to help identify bones recovered in Siberia in 1979 as the remains of Tsar Nicholas II, who was executed in 1918 along with his wife and children. The test required a female line descendant, as mDNA is passed unchanged from mother to child, unless there is a mutation. In Sheremeteva's case, mDNA from their shared ancestor, Empress Maria Feodorovna, passed to her great-grandmother, Grand Duchess Xenia of Russia, then to her grandmother, Princess Irene of Russia, and then to her mother, Princess Irina Yusopova, and finally to her.

== Ancestry ==
Ancestors of Irina Yusupova

8. Count Felix Nikolaievich Sumarokov-Elston
4. Count Felix Felixovich Sumarokov-Elston
9. Countess Elena Sergeievna Sumarokova
2. Prince Felix Felixovich Yusupov
10. Prince Nikolai Borisovich Yusupov
5. Princess Zenaida Nikolaievna Yusupova
11. Countess Tatiana Alexandrovna de Ribeaupierre
1. Princess Irina Felixovna Yusupova
12. Grand Duke Michael Nikolaevich of Russia
6. Grand Duke Alexander Mikhailovich of Russia
13. Princess Cecilie of Baden
3. Princess Irina Alexandrovna of Russia
14. Alexander III of Russia
7. Grand Duchess Xenia Alexandrovna of Russia
15. Princess Dagmar of Denmark

== Bibliography ==
- Mitterrand, Frédéric (2001) [1999]. Mémoires d'exil [Memories of exile] (in French). Paris, France: Pocket. ISBN 978-2-266-10451-7. OCLC 468744999.
