= Nevsky Prospect 86 =

Neoclassical palace in St Petersburg, Russia

Coordinates: 59°55′57″N 30°21′3″E

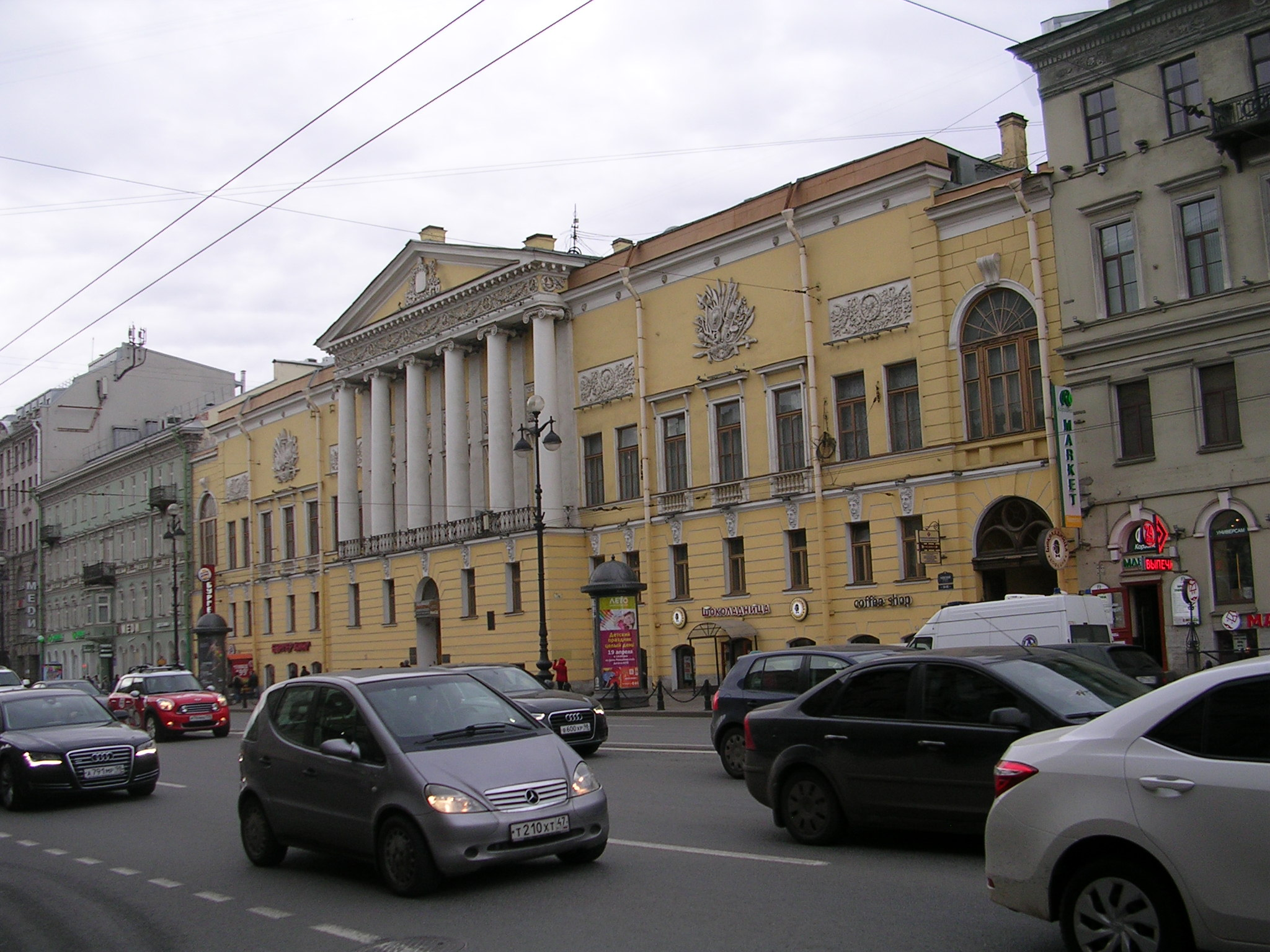
Nevsky Prospect 86

Nevsky Prospect 86 is a neoclassical palace situated on the Nevsky Prospect in St Petersburg, Russia. It is also known as the Palace of Arts or the Palace of Zinaida Yusupova.

The first palace on the site of the present palace was built in the middle of the 18th century, shortly after the founding of St Petersburg, by Prince Troubetzkoy. In the 1780s, his son, rebuilt and enlarged the original wooden structure in stone. At the end of the 18th century, the palace passed to the diplomat Prince Kurakin; it again changed hands during the first quarter of the 19th century, when it was sold to Colonel Fyodor Petrov-Solovovo. The new owner had the palace again rebuilt under the direction of the architect Mikhail Ovsyannikov. He created the neoclassical five columned centrepiece of the principal facade which is the corps de logis of the palace today. The same architect further extended rear the building between 1829 and 1832.

In 1835, the building had another new owner, Count Vladislav Branitsky; he employed the Swiss architect Gaspare Fossati to remodel and extend the palace. It was this architect who is responsible for the distinctive facade facing the Nevsky Prospect today. This facade is of nineteen bays, the central five bays are slightly projecting with Doric columns. Additionally, the facade is terminated at each end by slightly recessed bays containing a high segmented portal with a segmented window designed to be a pastiche of a Venetian window. The principal entrance is on the ground floor at the centre of the facade.

The palace comprises four floors, the two lowest, secondary floors, are a semi-basement and a mezzanine; both these floors form a rustic base to the two principal floors above. The third floor is a piano nobile and has tall casement windows; the fourth floor only has windows in the five central bays, the flanking seven bay wings at fourth floor level are adorned with heavy armorial bass relief panels. The central columned five bays are surmounted by a pediment, which once displayed the Branitsky arms, the coat of arms was defaced after the Russian Revolution, but the sculpted decoration which supported the arms remains.

Branitsky sold the palace to a member of the Kalugin family, who then resold it to Dmitry Bernadaki. Between the beginning of the 20th century and 1917 the palace belonged to Princess Zinaida Yusupova, though she probably never lived there, as she is known to have lived in her larger St Petersburg residence, the Moika Palace. In 1917, after the Russian Revolution, the building was nationalized.

The building is listed as a cultural monument of federal significance (as either Petrovo-Solovovo House or Zinaida Yusupova House). It is also a part (together with the whole ensemble of Nevsky Prospect) of the World Heritage site Historic Centre of Saint Petersburg and Related Groups of Monuments.
