= Konrad Seitz =

German academic and diplomat (1934–2023)

Konrad Seitz (18 January 1934 – 11 August 2023) was a German academic and diplomat.

== Biography ==
Konrad Seitz was born in Munich on 18 January 1934. He studied philosophy, history and classical philology in Munich and international economics and international law at Fletcher School (Tufts-Harvard, MA, 1967). In 1965 Dr. Seitz entered the German Foreign Service, and in 1975 he became a speechwriter for then-foreign minister Hans-Dietrich Genscher, a position he retained until 1987. Subsequently, he served as German ambassador to India, Italy and China.

Seitz was the author of a number of books. His book China. Eine Weltmacht kehrt zurück made it into a top-10 listing of important business books by financial information service Bloomberg.

Seitz died on 11 August 2023, at the age of 89.

== Publications ==
- Die japanisch-amerikanische Herausforderung. Deutschlands Hochtechnologie-Industrien kämpfen ums Überleben, Munich: Bonn Aktuell, 1990.
- Glotz, Peter and Süssmuth, Rita, Die planlosen Eliten. Versäumen die Deutschen die Zukunft? (with Glotz, Peter and Süssmuth, Rita) Munich: Stiebner Verlag, 1992.
- Europa. Una Colonia Tecnologica?, Milan: Edizioni di Comunità, 1995.
- Wettlauf ins 21. Jahrhundert. Die Zukunft Europas zwischen Amerika und Asien, Munich: Siedler Verlag, 1998.
- China - Eine Weltmacht kehrt zurück, Munich: Siedler Verlag, 2002.

== External links/Sources ==
- www.randomhouse.de
- www.akademie3000.de
- www.econ-referentenagentur.de
