= Polar Star Diamond =

Diamond

Polar Star
- Type of stone: diamond
- Weight: 41.28 carats (8.256 g)
- Color: D or E (colorless)
- Type: IIa
- Cut: cushion brilliant
- Country of origin: India
- Mine of origin: Golconda
- Original owner: Joseph Bonaparte

The Polar Star diamond is a 41.28 carat brilliant cushion-cut diamond, from the Golconda region in India. Its lower pavilion is arranged as an eight-pointed star, hence its name, from Polaris, the Northern Star. It is claimed that "the symmetry of the cut is so precise that it can be balanced on its culet" It is a rare type IIa diamond, meaning that it contains no nitrogen or boron. It is likely D or E color ("colourless"), with a trace of pink, and has blue fluorescence.

== History ==
The first record of the diamond's existence is around 1806 when it was owned by Joseph Bonaparte (eldest brother of Napoleon), who is reported to have purchased it from Morton for 52,500 francs. It is likely that he disposed of the diamond after abdicating and around the time of his settlement in the United States. It was bought in the 1820s by the Yusupov family (probably by Princess Tatiana Yusupov, wife of Prince Nikolai Borisovich Yusupov), whereby it passed to Prince Felix Yusupov, participant in the assassination of Rasputin. After the Russian Revolution, Yusupov and his family fled, taking the Polar Star, along with other gems such as La Pelegrina, the Sultan of Morocco and the Ram's head. To help sustain his family in exile, he sold the diamond to Cartier in 1924, who in turn sold the diamond in 1928 to Lady Deterding, the wife of the oil magnate Sir Henri Deterding, founder of Royal Dutch Shell. Following instructions from her will, Christie's auctioned the 'Polar Star' in Geneva on the 20 November 1980. It was bought by a Sri Lankan jeweller, Razeen Salih for 8 million Swiss Francs ($4.6 million) for the gem, which at the time was a record. The record was acknowledged by the Guinness Book of World Records, as the highest price per carat for a diamond at the time. Mr Salih's and his partner Sheikha Mahdi's company Mujoharat Al Sharq, in Jeddah purchased the 'Polar Star' for a client said to be a senior Saudi Arabian finance industry official.

== See also ==
- List of diamonds
