= Ekaterina Mikhailovna Ribeaupierre =

Russian noblewoman (1788–1872)

Ekaterina Mikhailovna Ribopierre
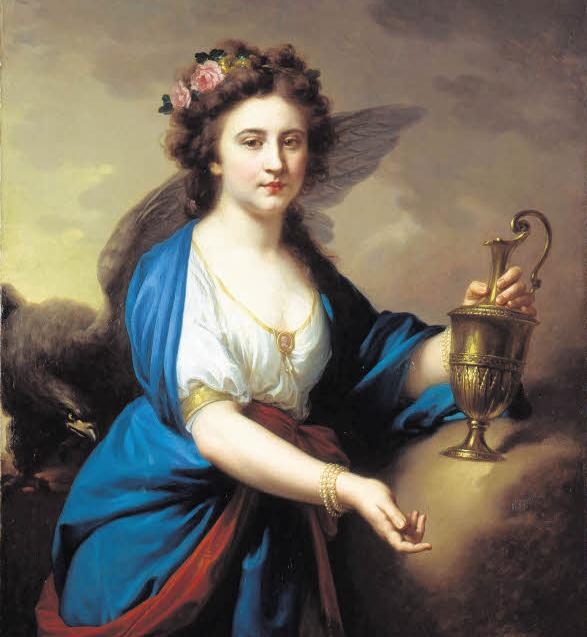
- E. M. Ribopierre in the image of Hebe in the portrait of J. B. Lampi (1809)
- Born: Ekaterina Mikhailovna Potemkina; 15 (26) June 1788; Saint Petersburg, Russian Empire
- Died: 2 (14) February 1872 (aged 83); Saint Petersburg, Russian Empire
- Cause of death: Dropsy
- Buried: Tikhvin Cemetery, Alexander Nevsky Lavra
- Noble family: Potemkin
- Spouse: Alexander Ivanovich Ribeaupierre
- Issue: Aglaida Alexandrovna; Sofia Alexandrovna; Mikhail Alexandrovich; Maria Alexanrovna; Ivan Alexandrovich; Tatiana Alexandrovna
- Father: Mikhail Sergeevich Potemkin
- Mother: Tatiana Vasilievna Engelhardt
- Occupation: State Lady

Countess Ekaterina Mikhailovna Ribopierre (née Potemkina; 26 June [O.S. 15 June] 1788 – 14 February [O.S. 2 February] 1872) was the wife of diplomat and chief chamberlain Alexander Ivanovich Ribeaupierre, a cavalry lady of the Order of Saint Catherine, State Lady of the court, and recipient of the Order of Queen Maria Luisa.

== Early life ==
Born on 26 June [O.S. 15 June] 1788, Ekaterina was the daughter of Lieutenant General Mikhail Sergeevich Potemkin (1744–1791) and Tatiana Vasilievna Engelhardt (1767–1841) who was a niece of Grigory Potemkin. She was named after her godmother Catherine the Great. Not long after her birth, her father died, and her mother remarried Nikolai Yusupov in 1793.

Ekaterina was brought up with her brothers by their mother in their palace on 54 English Embankment, Saint Petersburg.

== Personal life ==
She became acquainted with Alexander Ivanovich Ribopierre (1781–1865) at a young age. Alexander was the son of the Swiss Jean Ribeaupierre. The couple fell for each other, though Ekaterina's mother wished for a more advantageous marriage for her daughter and did not consent to the union; at one point Nikita Volkonsky was considered for a husband.

The couple aroused sympathy from others, Ekaterina's cousins, Prince Golitsyn and Count Branicki intervened on her behalf. Eventually the couple were married on 29 September 1809 in Saint Isaac's Cathedral. The marriage proved to be a happy one.

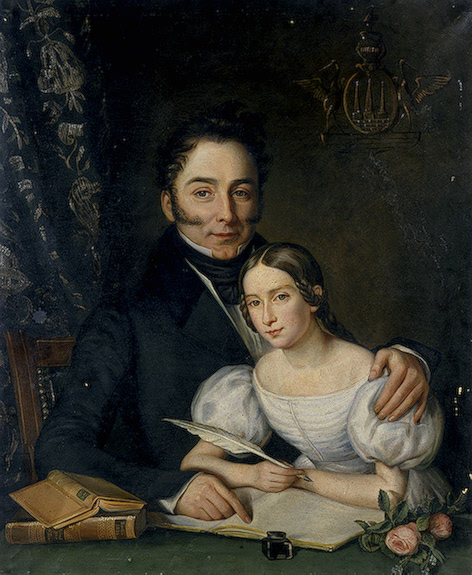
A. I. Ribopierre with his youngest daughter Tatiana (1836)

At first, they rented an apartment in Saint Petersburg on Gorokhovaya Street where they put on performances attended by the court including Alexander I. in 1822 they lived in Odessa where Alexander was working on business. In December of 1817, the couple and their children were on a ship that was shot at by Turkish forces while they sailed from Constantinople through the Bosporus Strait after the Battle of Navarino. Ekaterina was standing on the deck when the shooting began, and was seized by officers and carried to the cabin along with the children. After a storm in the Adriatic Sea during which the frigate almost crashed onto the rocks, the family landed at Trieste. They then spent time in Florence where they rented the magnificent villa from the Marquis Montecatini in Gataiola. Afterwards, they settled in the Palazzo Paterno in Rome. Following the signing of the Treaty of Adrianople in 1829, the family returned to Constantinople where they lived in the Russian embassy in Buyuk-Der which had an excellent view of the Bosphorus and a magnificent garden. There Ekaterina more than once received Sultan Mahmun. During Ribeapierre's stay on a diplomatic mission in Berlin beginning 1832, Ekaterina maintained her reputation as a hostess of luxurious receptions and arranged great festivities.

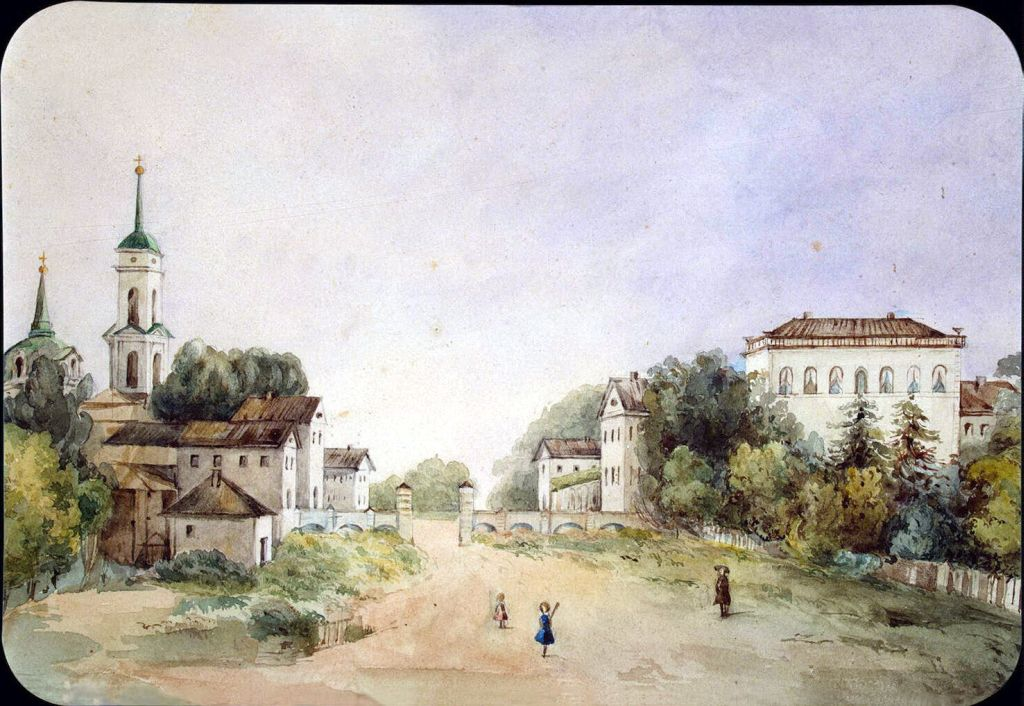
Manor Novoye Selo in a watercolor by the daughter of Countess Sophia

In 1839 they returned to Russia. They spent winters in Saint Petersburg and usually spent the summer at their estate Novoe Selo, Smolensk. The couple were regulars at all palace meetings and enjoyed the favour of the imperial family; they stood out in society because they shunned intrigue and gossip. Ekaterina had been made a cavalry lady of the Order of Saint Catherine (lesser cross) in 1826. In 1854, she became a State Lady, and at the coronation of Alexander II, she and her husband were elevated to the rank of count and countess.

According to Dorothea de Ficquelmont, even at her age, Ekaterina appeared remarkably youthful both in face and figure. She was characterised by grumpiness and pedantry, but under the cold appearance, she was a pleasant and amiable person. She was a talented artist, in her studio in the house on Bolshaya Morskaya she had a collection of paintings, copied from those at the Hermitage.

A contemporary wrote of her:

We entered a huge room, specially built in the outer part of the house, with a glass ceiling, with huge windows, which were hung with green curtains of various shapes and sizes; all the walls were covered with paintings, more or less finished.

After the death of her husband in 1865, Ekaterina Mikhailovna lived in seclusion in Saint Petersburg. In her later years, she was ill often, and according to her daughter, every movement caused her pain. During the attacks, she could not get out of bed, "she had water all over her body, her arms and legs were monstrously swollen and were heavy like marble. At the same time, her face was still beautiful, meek, and she was full of humility before what God had prepared for her".

She died of dropsy on 14 February [O.S. 2 February] 1872, and was buried next to her husband in the Tikhvin Cemetery of the Alexander Nevsky Lavra.

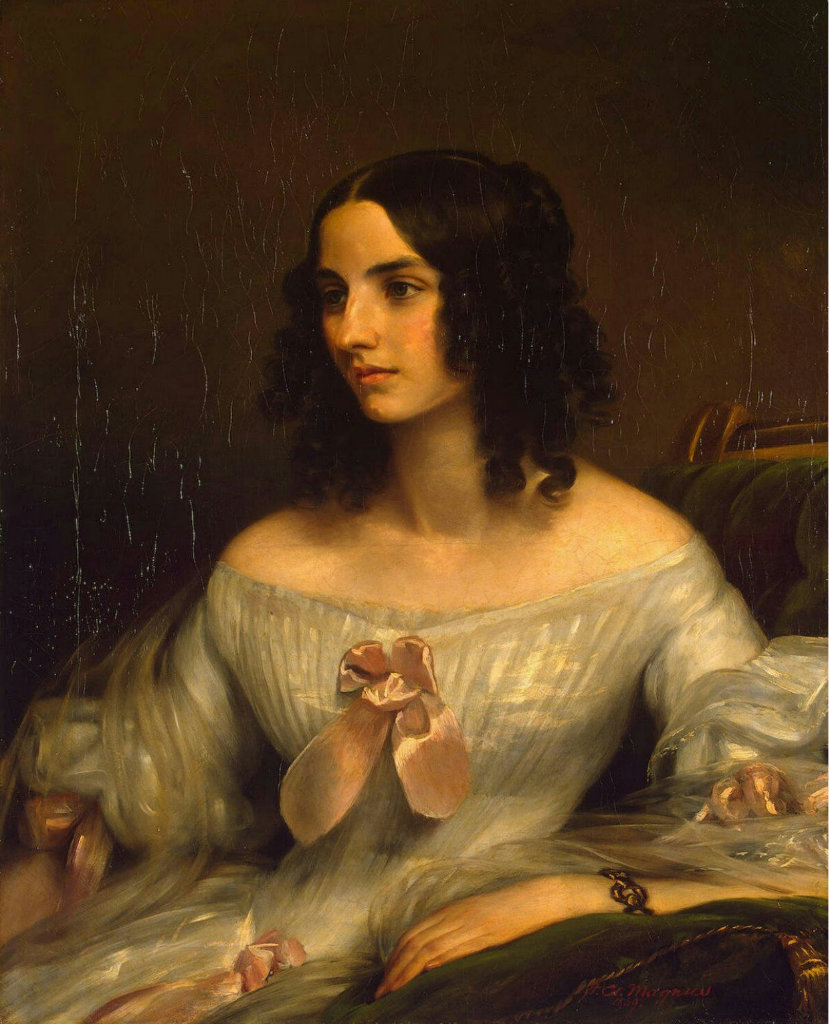
Aglaia Zenden (1839)

== Issue ==
- Aglaida (Anna) Alexandrovna (1812–1842), maid of honour, married Baron Ernest Senden, son of the Hessian envoy to Prussia on 4 October 1840. According to A.O. Smirovna, the Ribeaupierrs did not immediately agree to the marriage. The couple lived modestly, but happily.
- Sofia Alexandrovna (1813–1881), maid of honour, married Count V.P. Golenishchev-Kutuzov (1803–1873) in 1836.
- Mikhail Alexandrovich (died in infancy)
- Maria Alexanrovna (1816–1871), maid of honour, married Count Joseph Brassier de Saint-Simon (1798–1872), Prussian envoy in Constantinople, in 1849.
- Ivan Alexandrovich (1817–1871), chamberlain, married Princess Sofia Vasilievna Trubetskoya, daughter of cavalry general, adjutant general, and senator V.S. Trubetskoy in 1863. Their only son, Grigory Ivanovich Ribeaupierre (1854–1916) spearheaded the Olympic movement in Russia, was the organiser of an athletic society, and held the first wrestling championship in Russia.
- Tatiana Alexandrovna (1829–1879), maid of honour, wife of Prince Nikolai Borisovich Yusupov, mother of Princess Zinaida Yusupova.

== Sources ==
- Maykov, Pyotr [in Russian] (1913). "Рибопьер, Екатерина Михайловна". Русский биографический словарь т. 16: Рейтерн — Рольцберг. Русский биографический словарь. pp. 178–179.
