= La Pelegrina pearl =

Famous pearl owned by Princess Yusupova

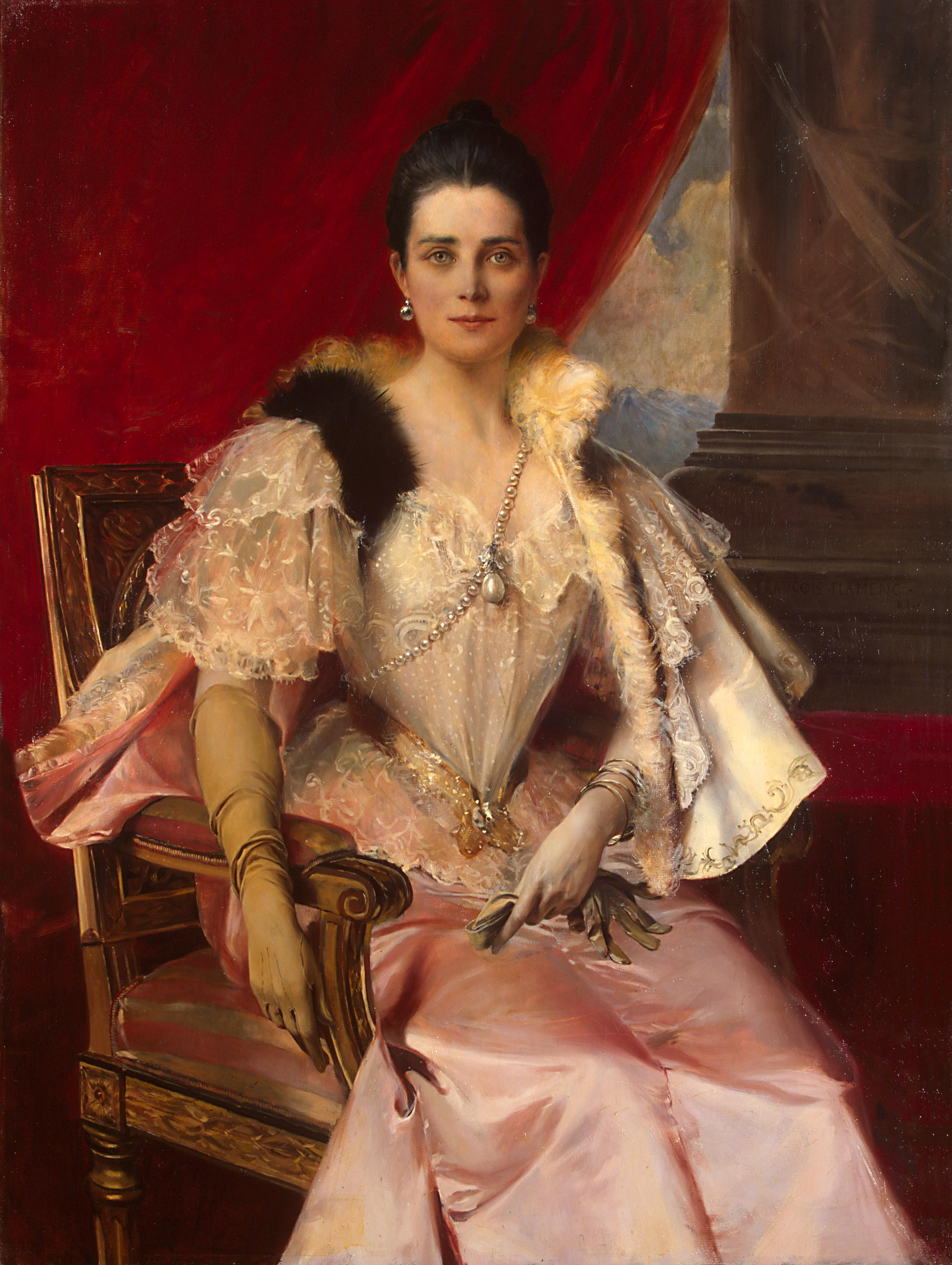
Portrait of Zinaida Yusupova wearing La Pelegrina pearl

La Pelegrina pearl is one of the most famous pearls in the world. Its history spans more than 350 years, and it has survived both the French Revolution of 1789–99 and the Russian Bolshevik (Communist) revolution of 1917. It was owned by European kings and queens.

== Origin of name ==
"La Pelegrina" is a Spanish word. Some gem historians translated it as "the Incomparable", but actually "La Pelegrina" has no such meaning in Spanish. Other gem historians believe that the name "La Pelegrina" was made to show a connection between "La Pelegrina" and another famous pearl La Peregrina. "La Peregrina" means "the Pilgrim" or "the Wanderer", and rhyming the names "La Pelegrina" and "La Peregrina" could mean that the name "La Pelegrina" was meant to be also "the Pilgrim" or "the Wanderer", and a single letter was changed to distinguish between the two different pearls.

== Physical characteristics ==
The original weight of this pear-shaped pearl was 133.16 grains. "The pearl undoubtedly has all the desirable characteristics under GIA's seven pearl value factors :- size, shape, color, luster, surface quality, nacre quality, and matching."

== History ==
The pearl was found by an African slave on the coast of the isle of Santa Margarita in the Gulf of Panama in the mid-16th century. The slave who found it was rewarded with freedom.

The historian and writer, Inca Garcilaso de la Vega, from the Spanish Viceroyalty of Peru, made the pearl famous. In his Royal Commentaries of Peru he wrote:

This pearl, by nature pear-shaped, had a long neck and was moreover as large as the largest pigeon's egg. It was valued at fourteen thousand four hundred ducats ($28,800) but Jacoba da Trezzo, a native of Milan, and a most excellent workman and jeweller to his Catholic Majesty, being present when thus it was valued said aloud that it was worth thirty—fifty—a hundred thousand ducats in order to show thereby that it was without parallel in the world.

The pearl made its first appearance in Spain in 1660, when Philip IV of Spain presented his daughter Maria Theresa with it. The occasion for the expensive present was the marriage of Maria Theresa to Louis XIV of France. Before the king gave it to his daughter he wore the pearl himself. An eyewitness noted:

The King (Philip iv.) had on a gray coat with silver embroidery: a great table diamond fastened up his hat from which hung a pearl. They are two crown jewels of extreme beauty—they call the diamond the Mirror of Portugal, and the pearl the Pelegrina

La Pelegrina traveled to France with its new owner. After the death of Maria Theresa in 1683 La Pelegrina's history went blank until it reappeared in Saint Petersburg in 1826. Although it is not known what happened to the pearl after Maria Theresa's death, there is good reason to believe she left it to her only son, and that the pearl entered the French Crown Jewels. Its last royal owner could have been Louis XVI, who was executed during the French Revolution.

The Crown Jewels were stolen in 1792 when the Garde Meuble (Royal Treasury) was stormed by rioters. It is possible that La Pelegrina was stolen together with the Sancy Diamond and French Blue Diamond, and was thereafter sold to the Russian nobles of the House of Yusupov. Zinaida Yusupova had her portraits painted while she was wearing the famous pearl. The pearl passed to her son, Felix Yusupov, best known for participating in the murder of Grigori Rasputin.

During the October Revolution of 1917 many jewels from the Yusupov collection were taken by the Bolsheviks, but La Pelegrina had a different fate. Felix was able to smuggle the pearl, together with a few other jewels, out of Russia. During the following years Felix sold some of his jewels, but he could not bring himself to sell La Pelegrina, one of his favorite treasures, until 1953, when he sold it to a Geneva-based jeweler, named Jean Lombard.

Jean Lombard later sold La Pelegrina to an anonymous European collector. The pearl disappeared from public view until 1989, when it resurfaced at a Christie's auction in Geneva. The auction catalog described it as a pear-shaped pearl pendant with diamond embellishments. La Pelegrina sold for a record sum of $463,800 (equivalent to $1,204,800 in 2025) at this auction. Since then, the pearl has remained with its anonymous buyer.
