= Tatiana Alexandrovna Yusupova =

Russian noblewoman and lady-in-waiting (1829–1879)

Tatiana Alexandrovna
- Princess Yusupova; Countess Ribeaupierre
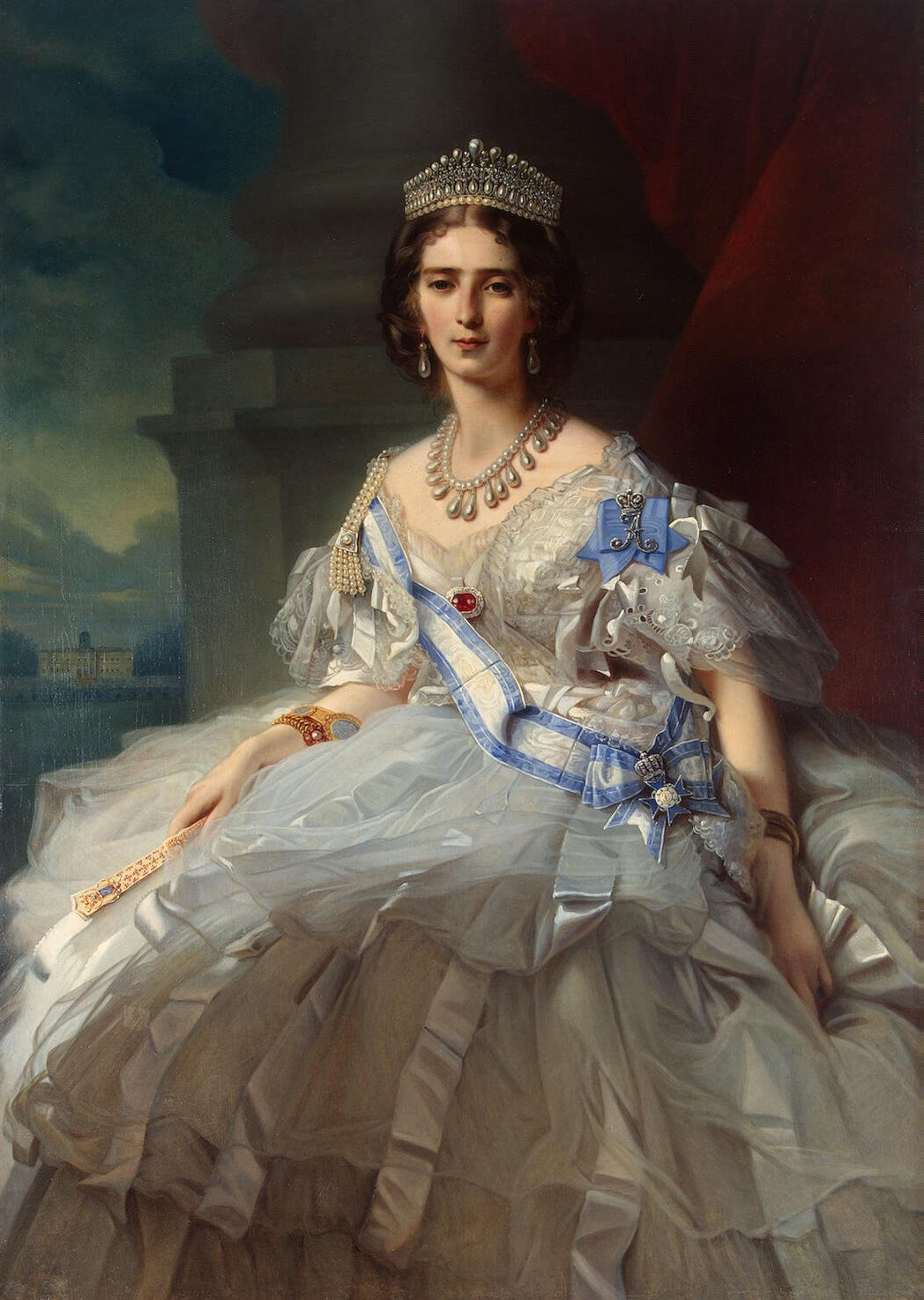
- Portrait by Franz Xaver Winterhalter, 1858
- Born: Countess Tatiana Alexandrovna de Ribeaupierre; 29 June 1829; Lucca, Italy
- Died: 14 January 1879 (aged 49); Nyon, Switzerland
- Buried: Nikolskoe Cemetery
- Spouse: Prince Nikolai Borisovich Yusupov (m. 1856)
- Issue: Princess Zinaida Nikolaevna; Prince Boris Nikolaevich; Princess Tatiana Nikolaevna
- Father: Count Alexander Ivanovich Ribeaupierre
- Mother: Ekaterina Mikhailovna Potemkina

Princess Tatiana Alexandrovna Yusupova (Russian: Татьяна Александровна Юсупова; 29 June 1829 – 14 January 1879) was a Russian noblewoman and lady-in-waiting to Empress Alexandra Feodorovna, of the Imperial Court of Russia. She was the Countess Ribeaupierre and wife of one of the richest landowners, Prince Nicholas Borisovich Yusupov.

== Early life ==
Tatiana was the youngest daughter of Count Alexander Ivanovich Ribopierre, a Russian diplomat of Swiss origin and Ekaterina Mikhailovna Potemkina, who was a niece of Prince Potemkin. She was born and raised abroad, where her father was stationed. In addition to her native French, she learnt German, Italian, English and Russian. Among her elder siblings was Maria Alexandrovna, who married Prussian Count Joseph Brassier de Saint-Simon, Prussian envoy in Constantinople, in 1849. She was known as "Tata" to her family members.

In 1839 the Ribopierres returned to Saint Petersburg and settled in a house on Bolshaya Morskaya. Tatiana often visited her grandmother and namesake, Tatiana Vasilievna Yusupova at her palace on the Moika where she became close to her cousin Nikolai Yusupov (1827—1891), with whom she maintained correspondence since 1852. Their close relation was the main reason why they could not marry, as marriages between cousins were forbidden by the Orthodox Church. Yusupov's mother also opposed the union which led to Nikolai being sent to the Caucasus, then Riga after graduation from university.

== Personal life ==
Immediately after the coronation of Alexander II, Count Ribeaupierre received official permission from Vladimir Adlerberg for the marriage of the pair. They were married 26 September 1856 in the St. Nicholas Church, village of Buturlino, Yukhnovsky district. For the occasion, Queen Marie of Prussia bestowed Tatiana with the Order of Theresa. They were also congratulated by Prince Charles of Prussia. Emperor Alexander invited the couple to Nice after the wedding, but the Holy Synod filed a case for an illegal marriage.

The Yusupovs spent the first years of marriage together in Munich and Paris. Tatiana was popular at the court of Napoleon III. In her own words she "was surrounded by ceremonial courtesy and attention" and her "tiara produced a magical effect, the emperor looked at her for a long time, and then came up and asked who made her". Around this time a ceremonial portrait of Yusupova was made by Winterhalter depicting her in a diamond-pearl diadem, which she bought from Caroline Bonaparte, a maid-of-honour cipher, and the Order of Teresa.

In the autumn of 1858, the couple returned to Saint Petersburg and resumed court life. In 1861, five years after the pair were wed, Tatiana became pregnant. The legality of the marriage was still a problem, all attempts to obtain a marriage certificate were unsuccessful. In order to solve the issue of the Yusupov inheritance, and to protect himself from the claims of the princes Golitsyn, Nikolai decided to transfer all his family estates to his wife for life, which he did in 1862. This caused rumours which claimed that the princess had forced her husband to do this, and that he was completely subordinate to her.

In reality, contemporary sources show that the spouses had very little in common. Yusopov was a man of extremes, often harsh and official which repelled those around him. He generously gave money to others and spent little on himself. Whereas, the princess was a determined and very energetic woman. By nature, she was kind, talkative, and responsive to any humorous remark. Having lots of free time, she read much European literature, and was considered one of the most educated women of her time.

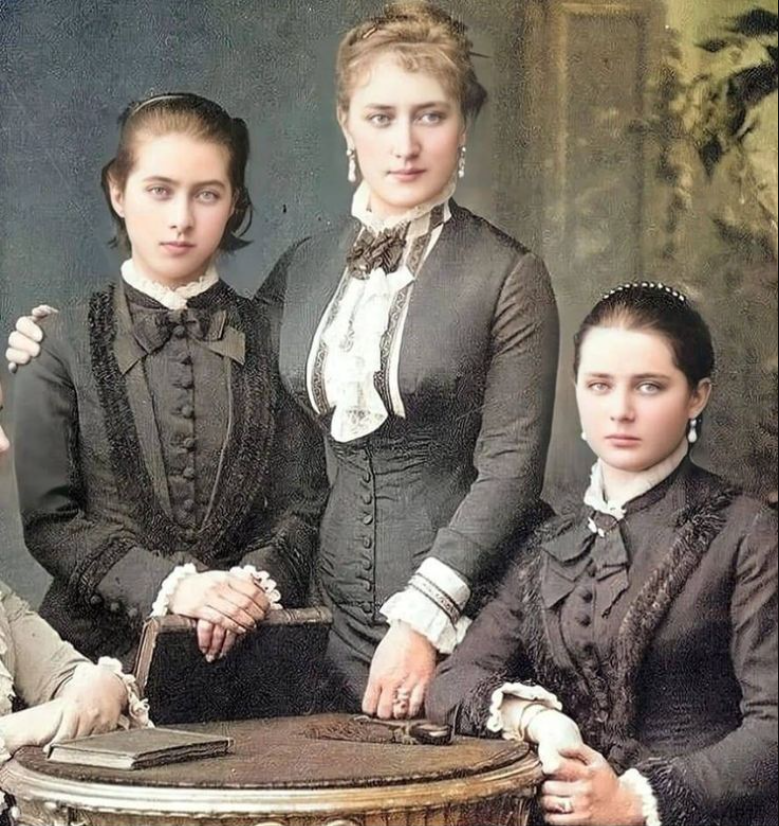
Princess Yusupov with her daughters Tatiana (left) and Zinaida (right)

=== Children ===
Together, Tatiana and Nikolai were the parents of three children:

- Zinaida Nikolaevna Yusupova (1861–1939), who married Count Felix Sumarokov-Elston (1856–1928).
- Boris Nikolaevich Yusupov (1863–1863), who died young of scarlet fever.
- Tatiana Nikolaevna Yusupova (1866–1888), who became a lady-in-waiting and died in 1888 of typhus.

The couple's first-born daughter was born in Moscow in October 1861, and named Zinaida after her paternal grandmother. In 1863, the couple had a son in Saint Petersburg named Boris after his paternal grandfather, though he died only at 2 months of scarlet fever. Tatiana was very upset by the loss of her son, her health began to deteriorate. At the advice of doctors, the family went abroad, living in Pau, Paris, and Nice. They bought a villa on Lake Geneva, 15 kilometers from Geneva named 'Tatiana'. Here, the couple had their third and final child, Tatiana, who became a lady-in-waiting and died in 1888 of typhus.

The princess' health was not improving. Doctors diagnosed her with diabetes mellitus. She then spent the summer of 1878 undergoing treatment at Karlsbad, but her health continued to deteriorate in September of that year. She suffered from weakness in her legs, bronchopneumonia, and became bedridden. In January 1879, Princess Yusupova died at her Villa. Her ashes were temporarily buried in the city cemetery in Geneva, but were later moved by Prince Yusupov to the Nikolskoe Cemetery of the Alexander Nevsky Lavra, where he himself was buried in 1891.

=== Descendants ===
Through her daughter Zinaida, she was a grandmother of Nikolai Felixovich Yusupov (1883–1908) and Felix Felixovich Yusupov (1887–1967), who married Princess Irina Alexandrovna of Russia (1895–1970), the only daughter and eldest child of Grand Duke Alexander Mikhailovich and Grand Duchess Xenia Alexandrovna of Russia. She was the first grandchild of Tsar Alexander III and the only biological niece of Tsar Nicholas II.
