= Tatiana Vasilievna Yusupova =

Niece of Prince Grigory Potemkin (1769–1841)

Tatiana Yusupova
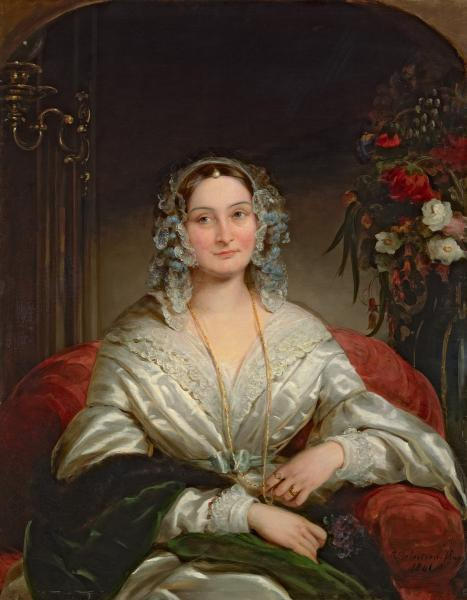
- Portrait by Christina Robertson (1841)
- Born: Tatiana Vasilievna Engelhardt; 12 January 1769
- Died: 24 May 1841 (aged 72); Saint Petersburg
- Buried: Annunciation Church of the Alexander Nevsky Lavra
- Noble family: Engelhardt
- Spouses: Mikhail Sergeevich Potemkin (m. 1785, wid. 1791); Nikolay Yusupov (m. 1793, wid. 1831)
- Issue: Alexandr Mikhailovich Potemkin; Ekaterina Mikhailovna Potemkina; Boris Nikolaevich Yusupov
- Father: Vasily Andreevich Engelhardt
- Mother: Elena Alexandrovna Potemkina
- Occupation: Lady-in-Waiting to Catherine the Great

Princess Tatiana Vasilievna Yusupova, née Engelhardt (12 (23 N.S.) January 1769 – 24 May (5 June N.S.) 1841) was a Russian aristocrat and courtier who was a niece of Prince Grigory Potemkin and a maid of honour to Empress Catherine the Great.

== Life ==
She was born into a poor family, to Vasili Andreevich Engelhardt, captain of the Smolensk gentry (1735–1794) and Martha (Elena) Alexandrovna Potemkina (1725–1775), the sister of Grigory Potemkin, lover and possible husband of Catherine the Great. Her siblings included Varvara, Catherine, Alexandra, and Vasili Engelhardt. Her childhood coincided with the rise of her uncle, so she and her sisters were provided with a bright future. Before the age of twelve, Tatiana had already become the maid of honour to Catherine II. At court, Tatiana attracted attention not only as the niece of the most powerful nobleman in Russia, but also due to her intelligence, beauty, and lively attitude.

The Duchess of Kingston who visited Saint Petersburg and joined the court in 1777, became attached to the then fifteen-year-old Tatiana, treating her like a daughter. She offered to make her the heiress of her entire, vast fortune if she would leave with her and travel to England. Tatiana refused, not having needed funds since the family's rise to power.

On 11 September 1785, Tatiana married a distand relative, 25 years her senior, Lieutenant General Mikhail Sergeevich Potemkin (1744–1791). The couple had two children Alexander and Catherine, whose godmother was the empress. Six years later in 1791, Mikhail Potemkin died suddenly. Widowed, Tatiana retired from court and only visited occasionally at the insistent requests of the empress herself.

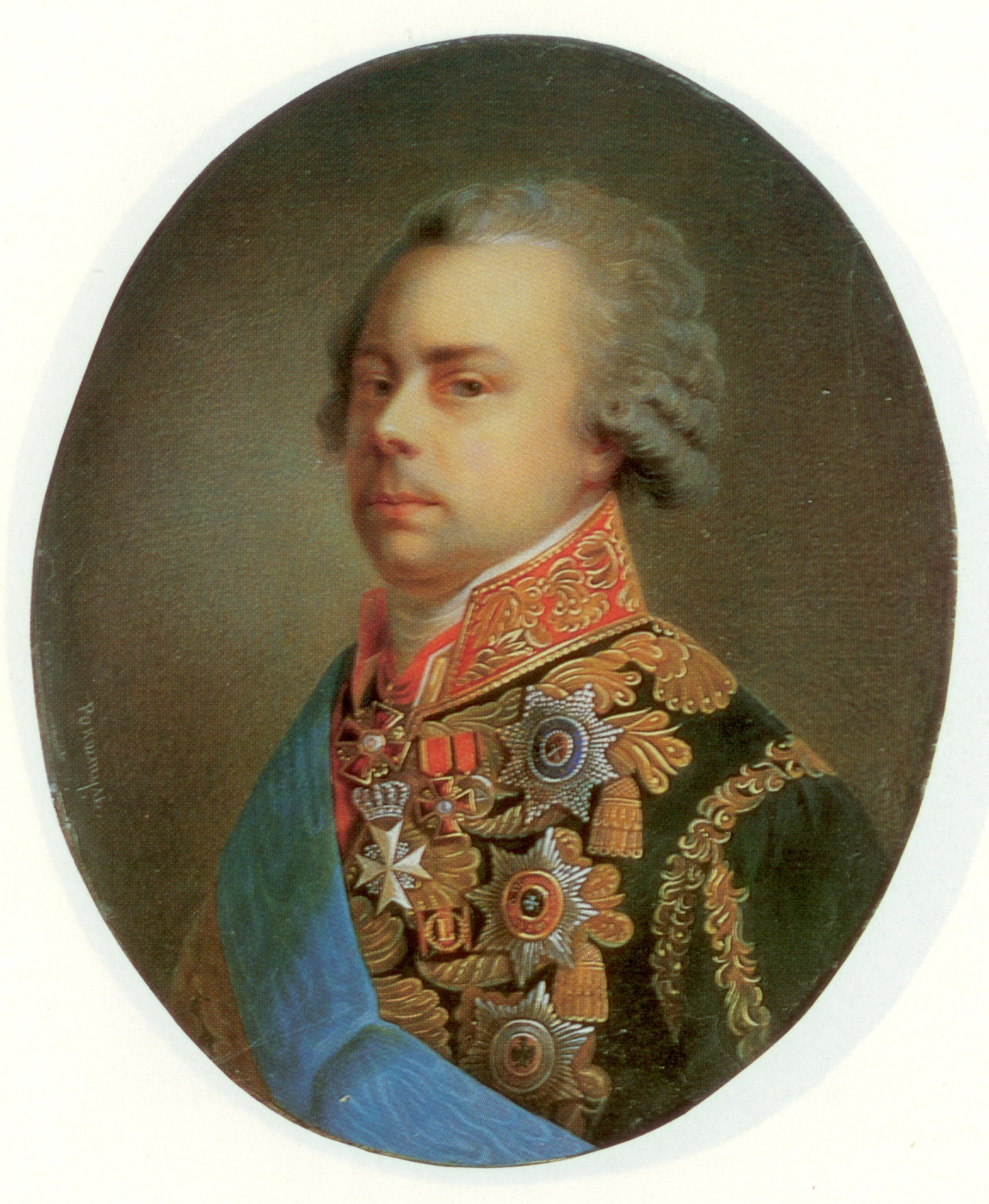
Prince Nikolai Yusupov

Soon she met nobleman Prince Nikolai Borisovich Yusupov, who had recently returned from Italy where he was stationed at the embassy. With the blessing of Catherine II they were married in 1793. A year later their son Boris was born. However, the marriage was unhappy and the couple began to live separately. Tatiana left court again and devoted herself to raising her son.

She hosted the famous St. Petersburg salon in her house on the English Embankment. Her circle included Gavrila Derzhavin, Ivan Krylov, Vasily Zhukovsky, and Alexander Pushkin. She lived with Praskovya Grigorievna Lupolova, the daughter of an exiled man who had come to the capital to seek mercy for her father and found the patronage of Yusupovna, Daria Trubetskaya, and Avdotya Golitsina. At the Yusupov's house, Lupolova was introduced to Empress Maria Feodorovna who was able to use her influence to have her father pardoned.

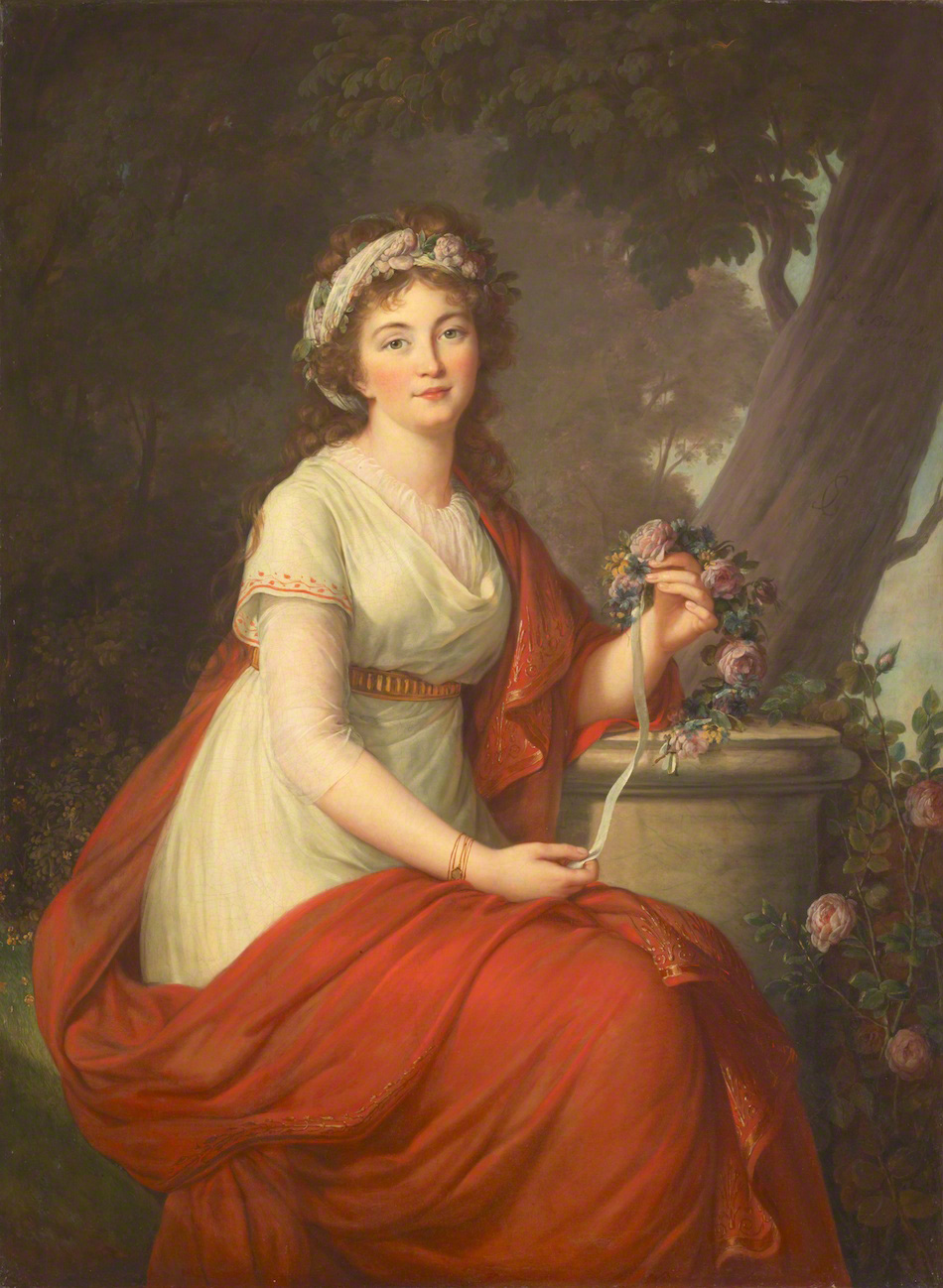
Tatiana Yusupova in a portrait by Élisabeth Vigée Le Brun (1797)

Tatiana was skillful at managing the family's affairs, she herself managed the numerous estates of her husband and managed to increase the already huge fortune of the family, although her inheritance from Potemkin amounted to 18 million rubles. She was considered by society as an expert in financial matters and many turned to her for advice. Some mistook her modest lifestyle, simple dining, and dislike of luxury for stinginess. In reality, she donated large sums to charity, often anonymously. She took an active part in the fate of serf poet Slepushkin by buying him and his family out of serfdom for 3,000 rubles.

She was fond of collecting precious stones. Her collection included several world-famous pieces, such as the Polar Star diamond, Marie Antoinette's Diamond Earrings, the Al-debaran diamond, a large sapphire, the pearl and diamond diadem of Caroline Bonaparte, Queen of Naples, and the Pelegrin pearl.

She outlived her husband by ten years and died on 24 May 1841, "retaining her famous mind and charm to the end". She was buried in the Annunciation Church, Alexander Nevsky Lavra.

== Legacy ==
Her great-great-grandson, Prince Felix Yusupov, described her in his memoirs:

Princess Tatiana was not only a perfect hostess, as gracious as she was witty, but also proved to be an excellent businesswoman. Under her wise administration her husband's fortune increased, while the standard of living of the peasants on the Yusupov estates was much improved. [...] Notwithstanding her many virtues, she loved beautiful clothes.

== Issue ==
Children from her first marriage to Lieutenant General Mikhail Sergeevich Potemkin (1744–1791) are:

- Alexandr Mikhailovich Potemkin (1787–1872), Active Privy Councillor, married to Princess Tatiana Borisovna Potemkina
- Catherine (1788–1872), married to Count Alexander Ivanovich Ribopierre (1783–1865)

Children from her second marriage to Prince Nikolai Borisovich Yusupov (1750–1831)

- Prince Boris Nikolaevich Yusupov (1794–1849), heir to his father.
- Nikoli (1795-1796)
- Maria (1802-?)
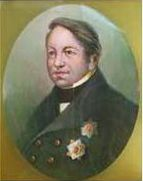
Alexandr Potemkin

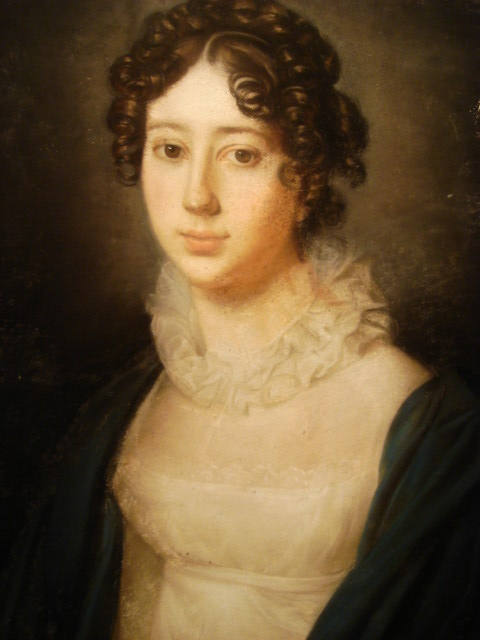
Catherine Potemkin, later Ribeaupierre

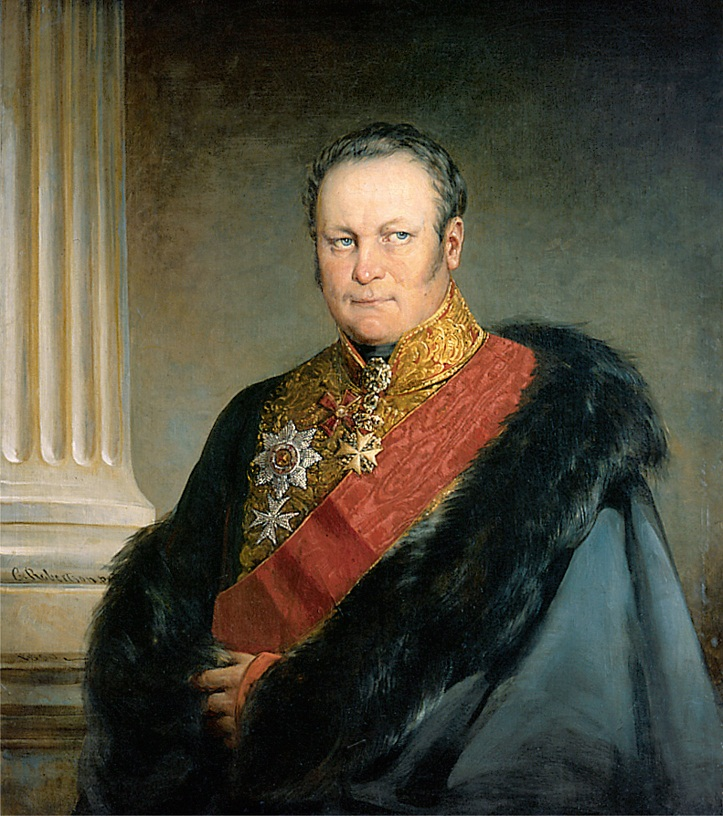
Boris Yusupov
