= Zinaida Ivanovna Yusupova =

Russian courtier (1809–1893)

Princess Zinaida Ivanovna Yusupova
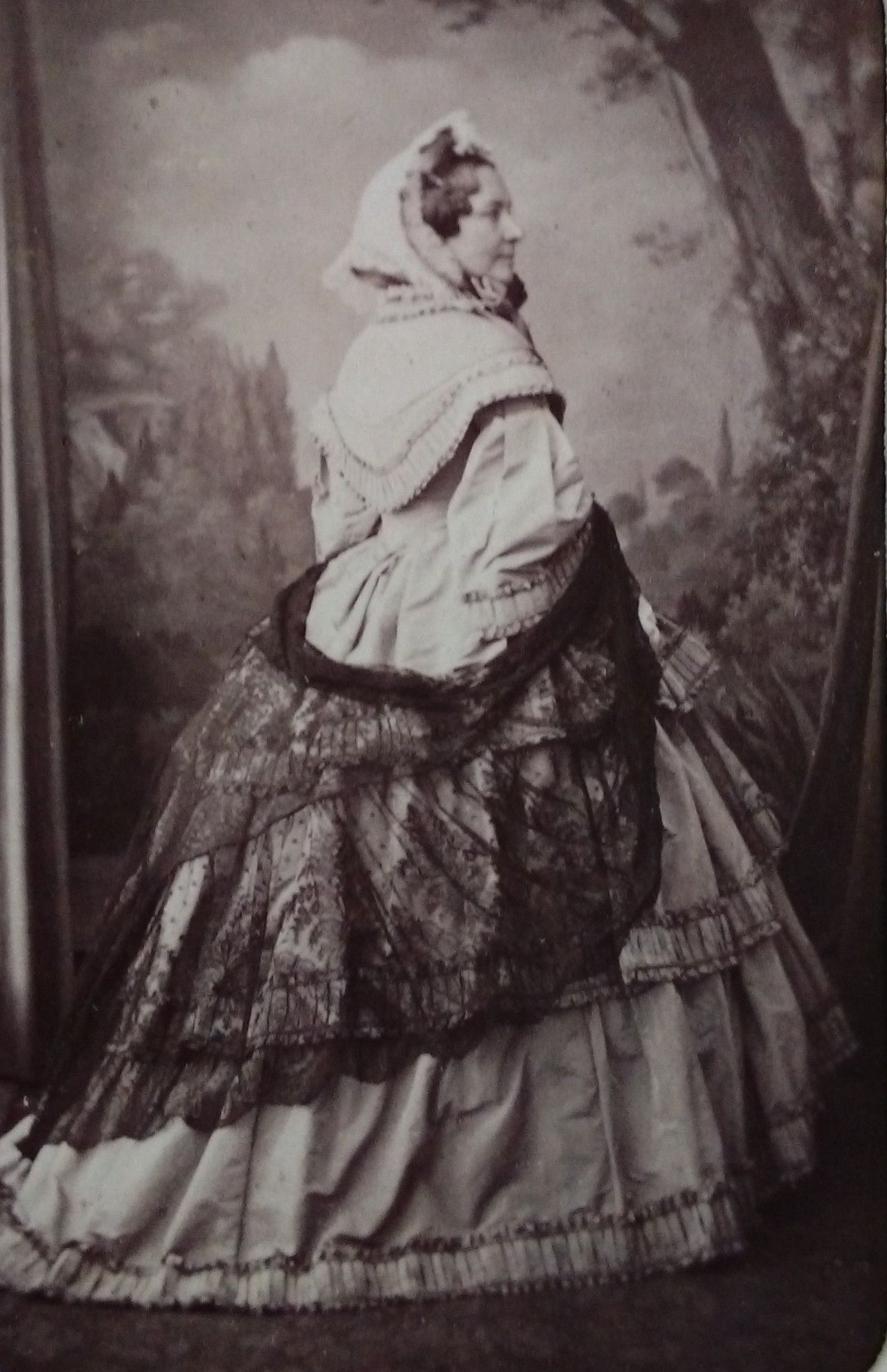
- Born: November 14, 1810; Moscow, Russia
- Died: October 16, 1893 (aged 82); Boulogne-Billancourt, France
- Spouse(s): Boris Nikolaevich Yusupov (m. 1827, wid. 1849); Louis Charles Honoré, Count de Chauveau (m. 1861, wid. 1889)
- Children: Nikolai Borisovich Yusupov (junior)
- Parent(s): Ivan Dmitrievitsj Narysjkin (1776-1848); Varvara Nikolajevna Ladomirskaja (1785-1840)

Princess Zinaida Ivanovna Yusupova, born Naryshkina (Russian: Зинаида Ивановна Юсупова; 14 November 1810 –16 October 1893) was a Russian aristocrat and socialite. She redecorated the Moika Palace to its current style, as well as the Yusupov Dacha in Tsarskoye Selo. She was a recipient of the Order of Theresa.

From 1861, she was known as the Countess de Chauveau.

== Biography ==
=== Family ===
Born in Moscow in 1810 to chamberlain Ivan Dimitrievich Naryshkin and Varvara Nikolaevna Ladomirskaia, Princess Zinaida was a member of the noble Naryshkin family. Among her ancestors were Natalia Naryshkina, mother to Peter the Great. Her maternal grandfather was Catherine the Great's favourite, Ivan Rimsky-Korsakov. Her granddaughter and namesake was the heiress Zinaida Yusupova, and her great-grandson Felix Yusupov, Rasputin's murderer.

Zinaida and her brother Dimitri received a good education, which prompted the former's interest in poetry and art. Later, she continued the art collection of her parents-in-law.

=== First marriage ===
As a young girl, Zinaida was made a lady-in-waiting to the new tsarina, Charlotte of Prussia. During the coronation of Nicholas I in 1826, 15-year-old Zinaida caught the eye of 32-year-old widower Boris Nikolaevich Yusupov, known as Borinka to intimates, who became determined to marry her.

After being delayed at the request of Boris' mother, the pair wed on 19 January 1827 in Moscow. The wedding was somewhat chaotic, as Boris had to return home to collect his father's blessing and Zinaida Ivanovna dropped the ring during the ceremony and it could not be relocated. Another ring had to be procured.

The young princess soon lost interest in the marriage, however, writing to her father that she was "very bored in Saint Petersburg". Alexander Turgenev called her a "chained Zephyr" and said "She is still a piece of poetry, while her husband resembles despicable proze."

Almost nine months exactly after the wedding, Zinaida gave birth to a son, Nikolai. In 1829, Zinaida gave birth to a stillborn daughter named Anastasia. After this tragic incident, marital relations ceased between Zinaida and Boris.

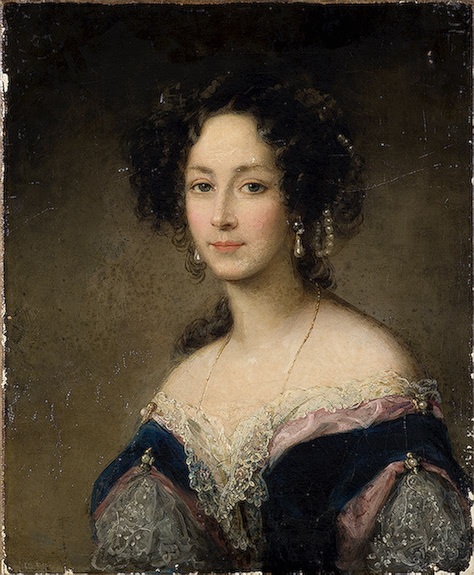
In 1840

=== Affairs ===
Zinaida Ivanovna was noted by her contemporaries for her intelligence and beauty. Prince Meshchersky called her "one of Saint Peterburg's lionesses", while Countess Dolly de Ficquelmont gave the following description: "tall, thin, with a charming waist and a perfectly shaped head. She has lively black eyes and a lively face with a lovely expression that suits her so well."

In 1830, Princess Zinaida began an affair with cavalry officer Nikolai Gervais (1807–1841). Countess de Ficquelmont wrote: "With surprising simplicity, she gave in to the strength of her feelings. [..] At every ball, she behaves as though she and Gervais are the only ones in the world. He is very young, with an unattractive face, but he is very much in love, sensitive and perhaps more capable than he is given credit for."

Soon enough, Zinaida's husband found out, which deeply saddened him. To put rumours to an end, Gervais left Saint Petersburg. He died in 1841 aged only 35 while on an expedition in Chechnya. The tsarina, Zinaida's former mistress, wrote that she let out "two sighs over Gervais, over his overly loyal heart, that has continued to beat for Zinaida until his death."

In his memoirs, Zinaida's great-grandson Felix Yusupov also described "a romantic attachment for a young revolutionary whom she followed to Finland where he was interned in the Sveaborg Fortress. She bought a house on a hill facing the prison in order to be able to gaze at her beloved's window from her room." He also claimed that, in 1846, Zinaida had an affair with Emperor Nicholas I. However, in the same book, Yusupov claims that his great-grandmother died at a hundred years old in 1897, which is factually incorrect, so the validity of his claims can be called into question. He also stated that in 1925, Bolsheviks discovered a hidden room behind Zinaida's bedroom in her house in Paris, which contained a coffin and a male skeleton.

=== Second marriage ===
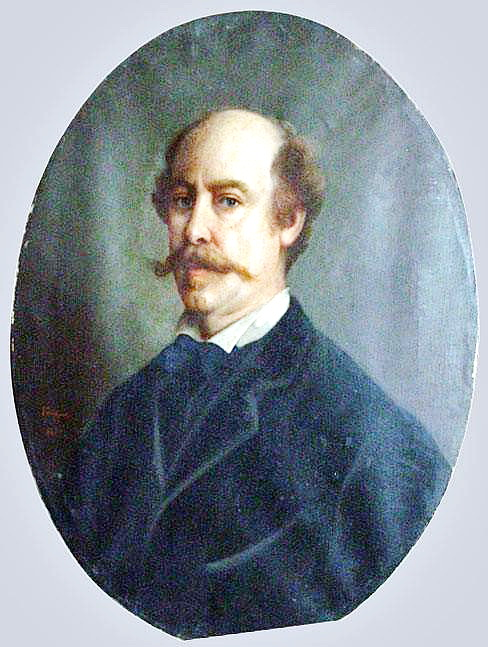
Zinaida's second husband

In 1849, Prince Boris died, and Zinaida moved to Parc des Princes in Paris. She was a popular hostess there, and the future Napoleon III tried to court her, to no results. At a ball there, she met Louis Charles Honoré Chauveau (1829–1889), a staff captain of the National Guard twenty years her junior. On 7 May 1861, they wed in the chapel of her house on Liteyny Avenue in Saint Petersburg. On the wedding document, the couple gave their ages as 46 and 32, when Zinaida was in fact fifty. To make the marriage seem more appropriate, Zinaida procured the titles of Count of Chauveau and Marquis de Serre for her new husband. From 1860, he was also the overseer of the Finistère district for Emperor Napoleon III.

In 1862, Zinaida bought the Château de Keriolet for her husband. During their marriage, Louis-Charles had a long-term affair with Jeanne Ducos, daughter of Théodore Ducos. Together, they had a son, Yves (1883) and Anne de Chauveau-Ducos (1885). He died in 1889 from a heart attack aged only 60. He left the château to either his sister Emma, according to most sources, or his mistress Jeanne, according to Felix Yusupov. In any case, Zinaida bought back the house from her for 1,5 million francs.

=== Later life ===
In 1891, Princess Zinaida sold the Château de Keriolet to the French government on the condition that it would be turned into a museum. She stayed in her house in Parc des Princes, Boulogne-Billancourt, with a companion. Her great-grandson Felix remembered her:

I can see her now, enthroned majestically in a huge armchair, the back of which was decorated with three coronets, the emblems of her triple rank as princess, marchioness, and countess. In spite of her extreme old age, she was still beautiful and had retained an imposing appearance and aristocratic bearing. Always carefully made up and perfumed, she wore a red wig and an impressive number of pearl necklaces.

In 1891, her only son Nikolai died aged 63. Therefore, when Zinaida died two years later, she left all her jewels to her granddaughter and namesake, her Moscow residences to her great-grandson Felix and her house in Paris to his brother Nicholas Yusupov (1883–1908). Her body was transported to Russia, where it was buried in the Coastal Monastery of Saint Sergius.

== Legacy ==
- The village Zinaidino was named after her.

== Palaces ==
- In 1830, Zinaida and her first husband bought the Moika Palace in Saint Petersburg. Zinaida personally oversaw the renovations, which took seven years. When they were finished, a great ball was thrown in celebration. After Boris died in 1849, the palace was inherited by their child, Nikolai Borisovich Yusupov.
- In 1849, Zinaida commissioned the construction of a new house on Liteyny Avenue, which she decorated to her own "whimsical, feminine taste". After her death, the house was inherited by her great-grandson Felix.
- Her house in Parc des Princes, Boulogne-Billancourt, Paris was left to her great-grandson Nicholas, who died in 1908. After his death, the house was vacant for many years until it became a girls' school, the Cours Dulancoup, which her great-great-granddaughter attended.
- The Château de Keriolet, bought first in 1862 and secondly in 1889, was sold by Zinaida in 1891 to the French government, which turned it into a museum.
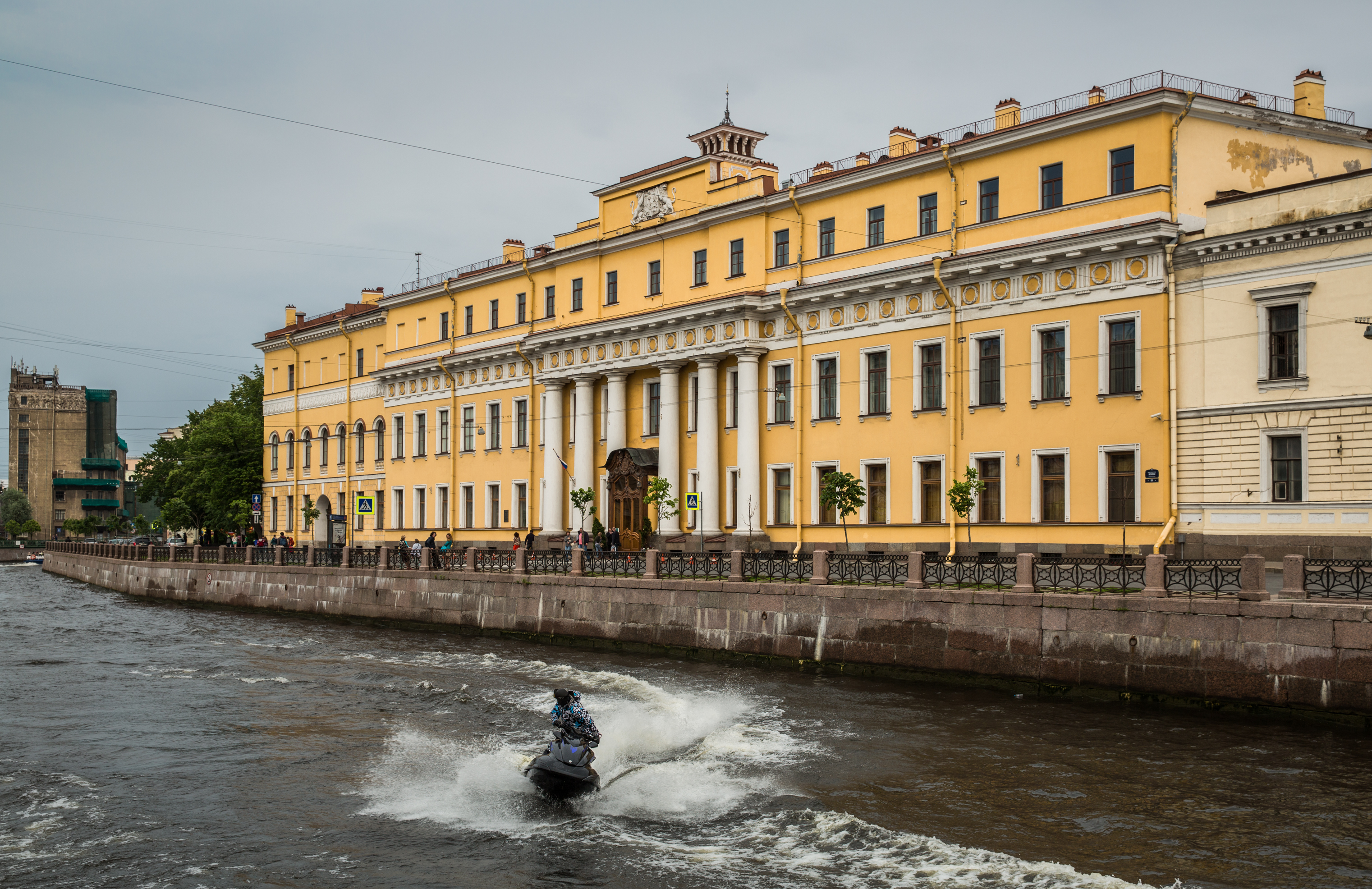
Moika Palace

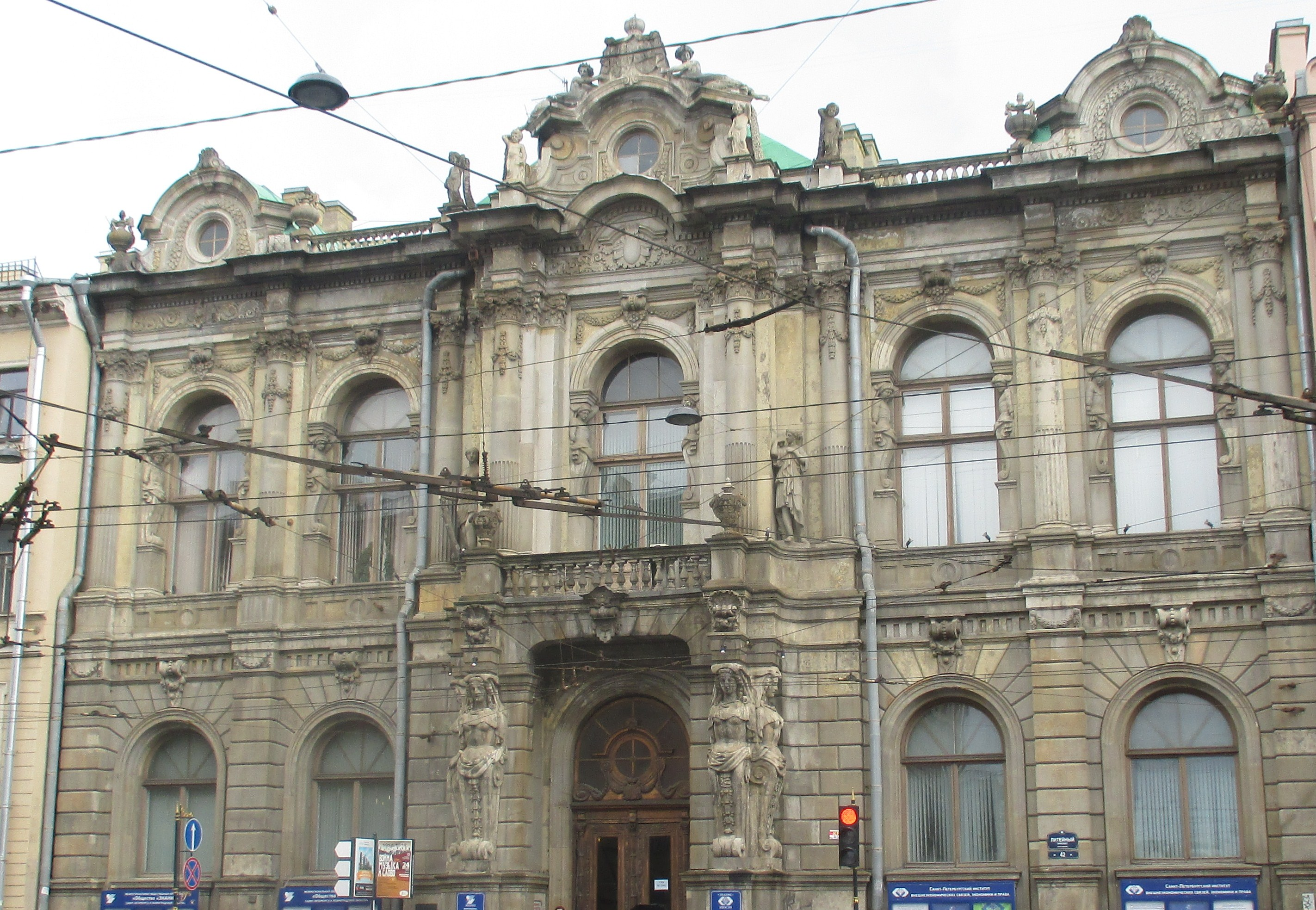
Zinaida's house on Liteyny Avenue

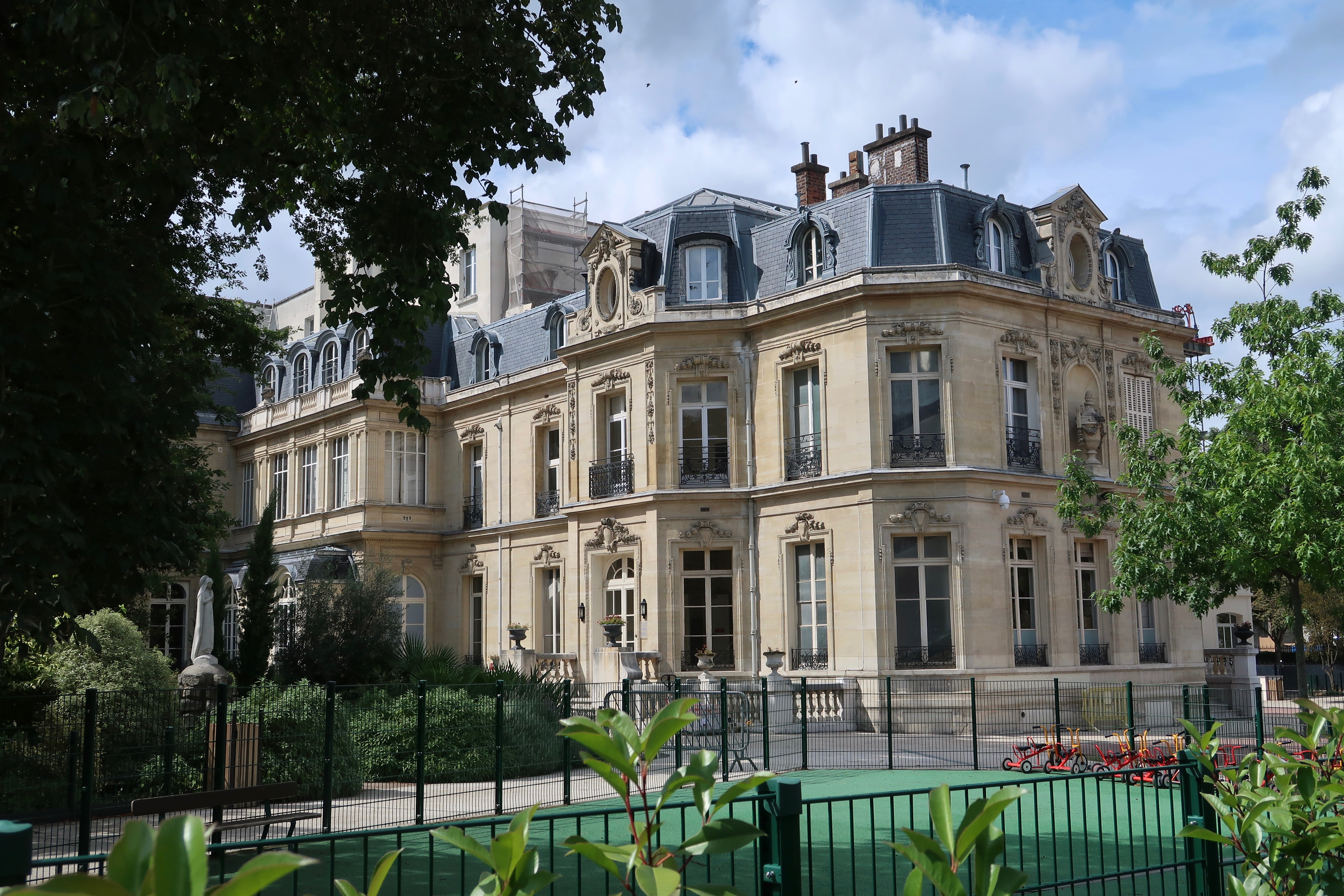
Zinaida's house in Parc des Princes, Boulogne-Billancourt

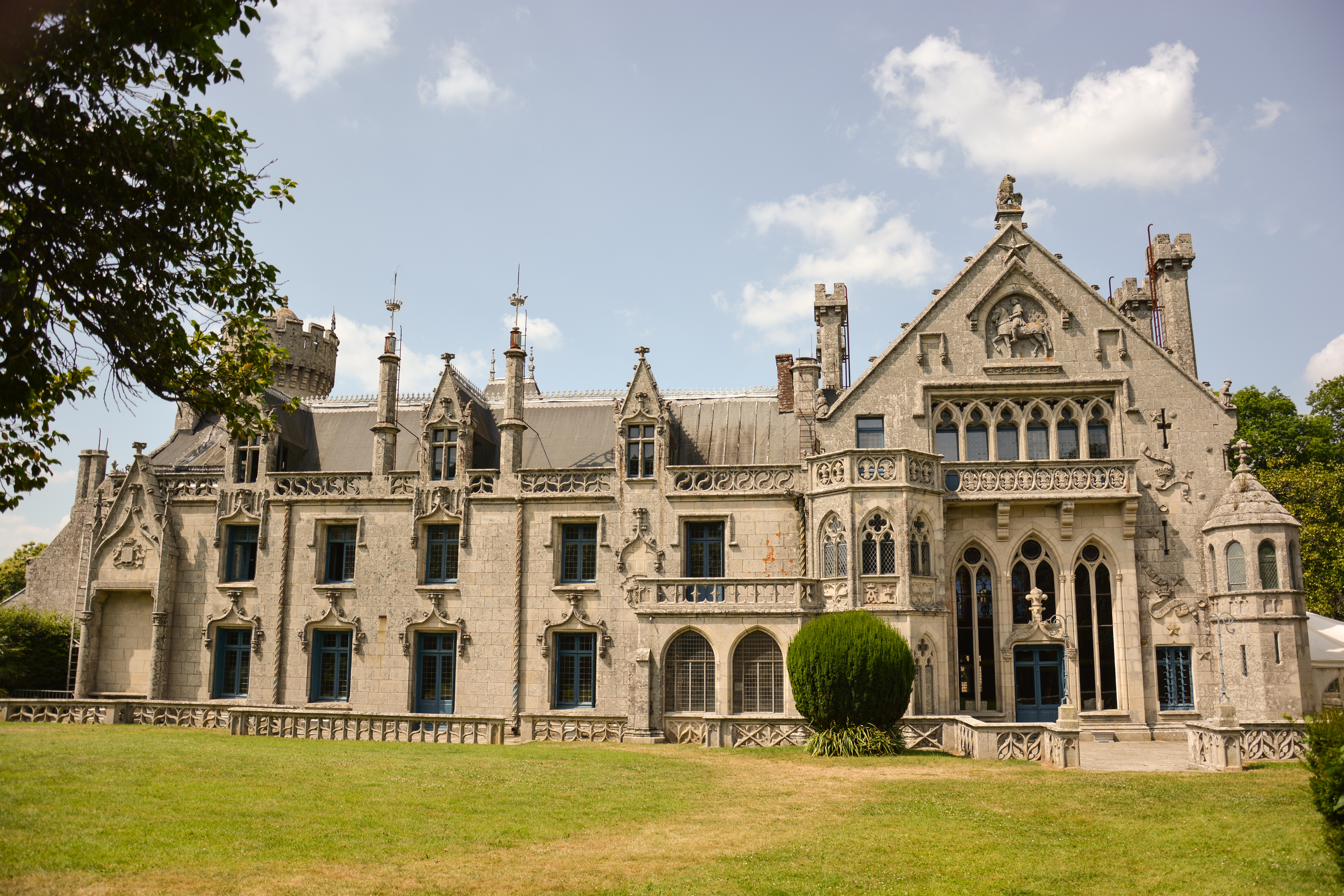
Château de Keriolet

== Gallery ==
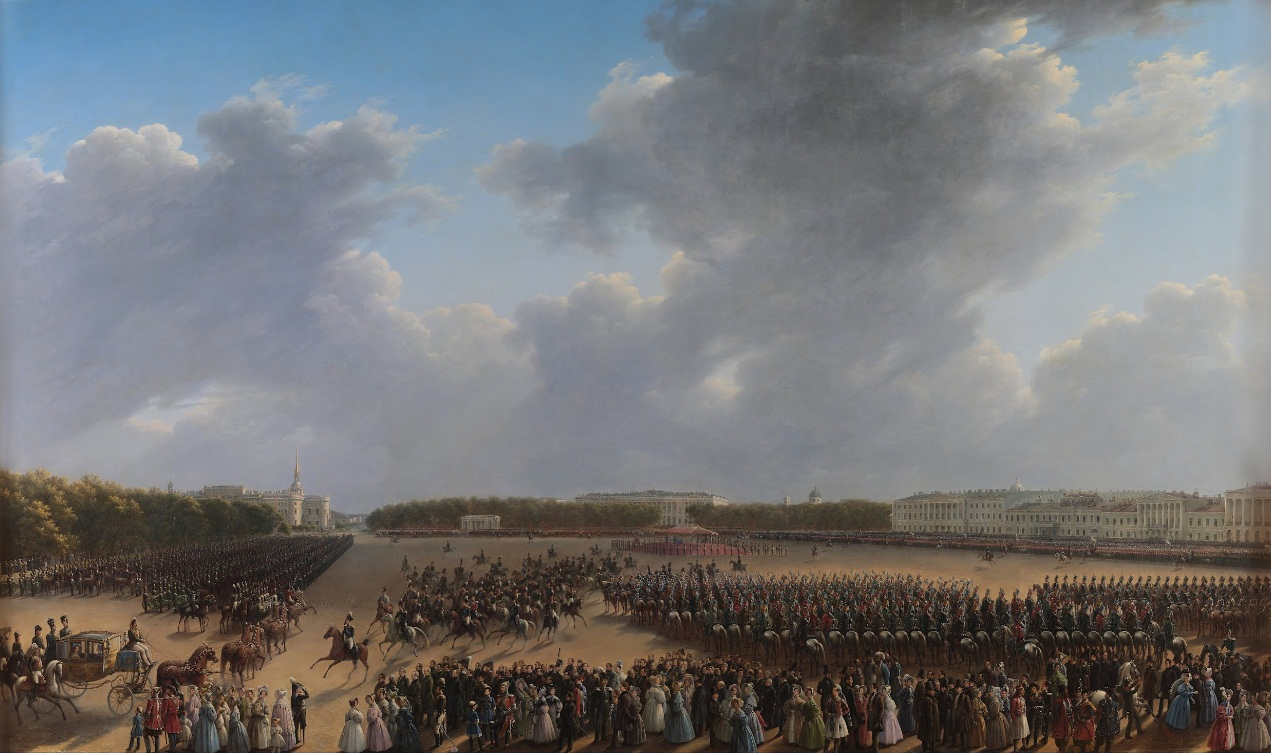
"Parade on the Champ de Mars" by Grigory Chernetsov (1831)

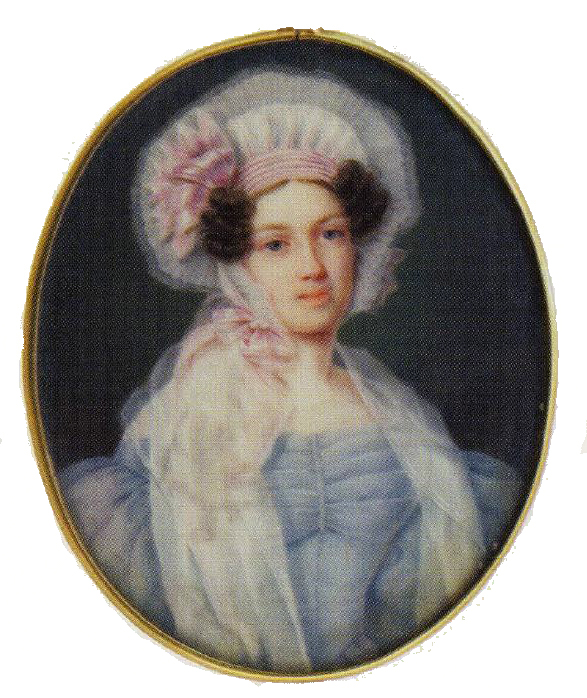
Portrait by Edmond Pierre Martin (1830)

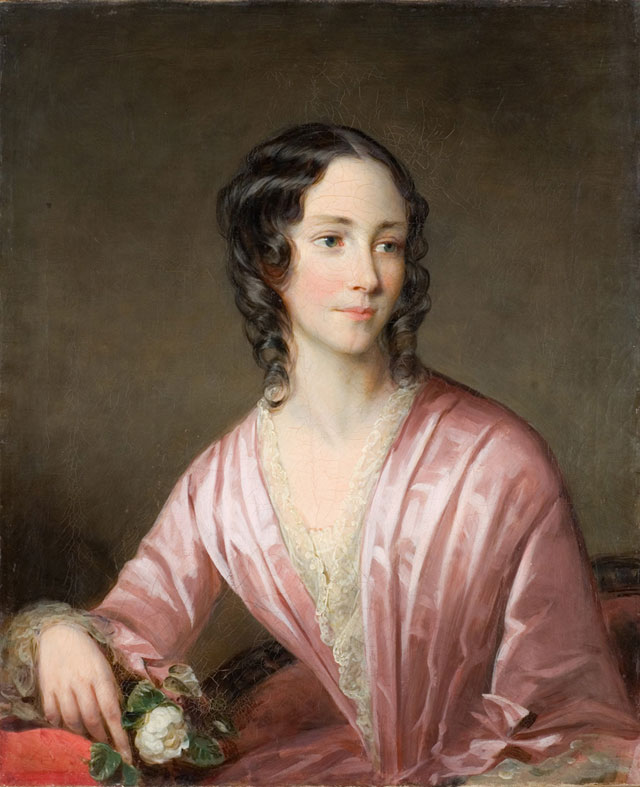
Portrait by Christina Robertson (1840)

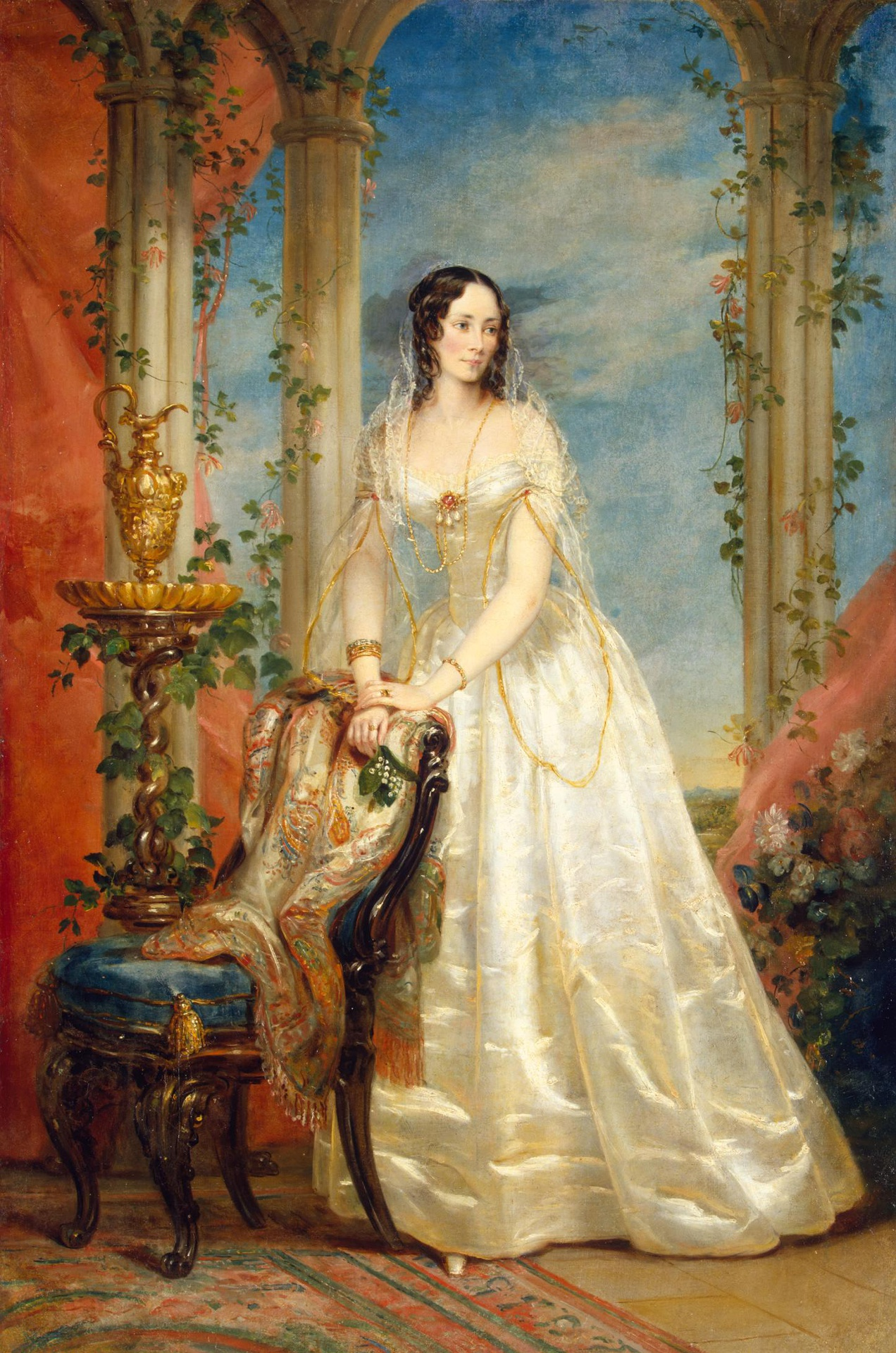
Portrait by Christina Robertson (1840)

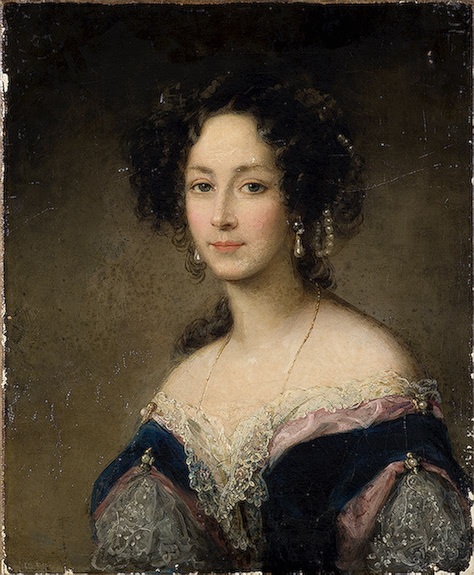
Portrait by an unknown artist, attributed to Christina Robertson (1841)

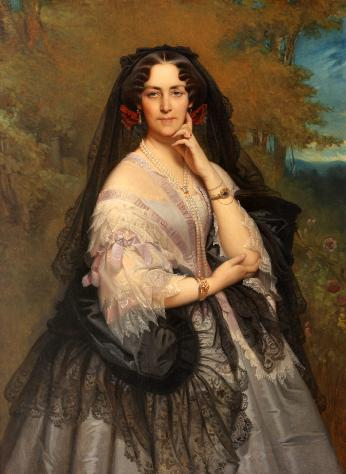
Portrait by Gerasim Ignatievich Kadunov (1858)

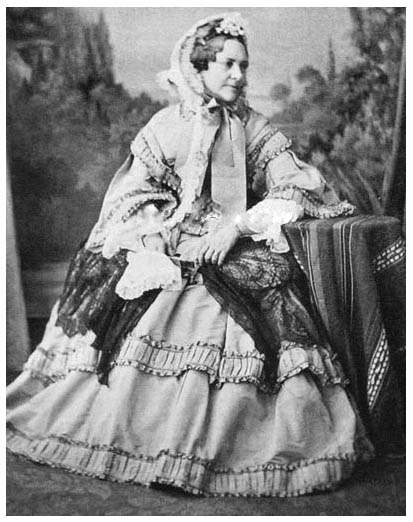
Daguerreotype of Zinaida (1860)
