= Tatiana Nikolaevna Yusupova =

Russian heiress (1866–1888)

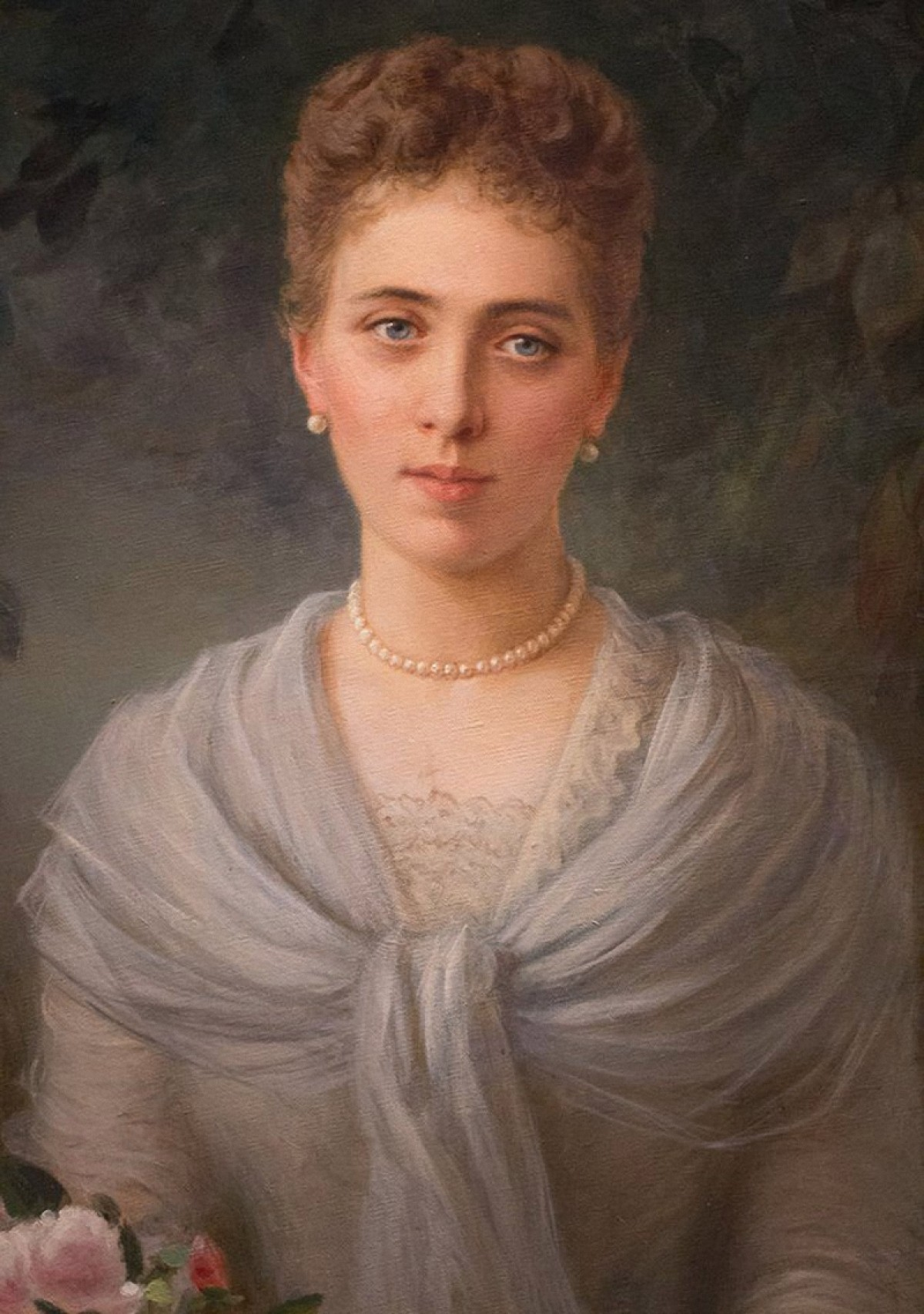
- Full name: Princess Tatiana Nikolaevna Yusupova
- Born: 14 February 1866; Geneva, Switzerland
- Died: 27 June 1888 (aged 22); Arkhangelskoye Palace, Russia
- Noble family: House of Yusupov
- Father: Prince Nicholas Yusupov
- Mother: Countess Tatiana de Ribeaupierre

Princess Tatiana Nikolaevna Yusupova (Russian: Татьяна Никола́евна Юсу́пова; 14 February 1866 – 27 June 1888) was the younger daughter of the statesman and landowner Nicholas Yusupov. A member of the House of Yusupov, she was one of the wealthiest heiresses in Russia, second only to her older sister Zinaida.

== Biography ==
Princess Tatiana was born on Valentine's Day 1866 as the youngest child of Prince Nicholas Borisovich Yusupov, Chancellor of Russia, and his wife, Countess Tatiana de Ribeaupierre, who was also his half-cousin and a famed beauty. Her two older siblings were Zinaida (1861), who became a famous society hostess, and Boris (1863), who died aged 3 months from scarlet fever.

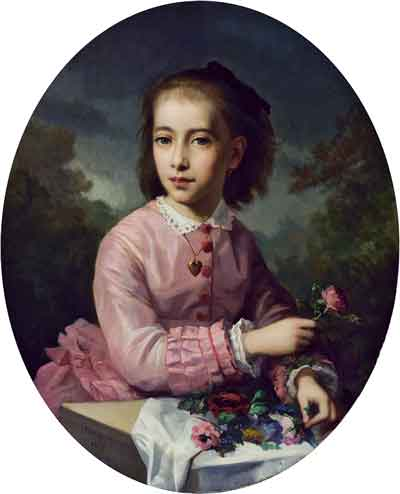
Portrait of Princess Tatiana, aged 9, by Jean-Baptiste Marie Fouque

Tatiana was born and raised in Lake Geneva, where her parents had lived on account of her mother's bad health. Prince Nicholas had bought a villa there named Villa Tatiana. Tatiana was named both after the house and her mother.

Known within her family as "Tanyok", she wrote many poems in her childhood, even in French. In 1878, her mother was diagnosed with diabetes, and pneumonia and became bedridden. She died in January 1879. Shortly after, Prince Nicholas moved back to Saint Petersburg with his two daughters, seventeen-year-old Zinaida and thirteen-year-old Tatiana.

The family enjoyed immense wealth from their sugarbeet factories, sawmills, distilleries and oil fields. They owned over fifty estates throughout Russia, including the Moika Palace, Yusupov Palace and Arkhangelskoye Palace. On 4 April 1882, her sister married Count Felix Sumarokov-Elston.

On 5 June 1883, aged only fifteen, she was made a lady-in-waiting to Empress Maria Feodorovna.

At court, Tatiana Yusupova fell in love with the Emperor's youngest brother, Grand Duke Paul Alexandrovich Romanov (1860–1919). He did not reciprocate her feelings and turned her down. Tatiana wrote:

"It is absolutely impossible for me to be happy now, whatever happens. Friendship is God's purest blessing, but I have not succeeded in keeping this treasure, and I will die without fulfilling my lifelong dream. Just like you, Paul, I am not someone's other half. The idea of growing old does not interest me much, but I do not want to grow old alone."

From April 1888, Tatiana was staying with her sister Zinaida and her husband at Arkhangelskoye Palace. There, she suddenly died two months later from typhoid fever. However, it was rumoured at the time that Tatiana had actually committed suicide after hearing about Grand Duke Paul's engagement to Alexandra of Greece. She was buried at Arkhangelskoye. A statue of her as an angel was made by Mark Antokolsky, and a copy of it was kept at the Moika Palace. Her nephew Nicholas was buried with her when he was killed at age 25.

== Gallery ==
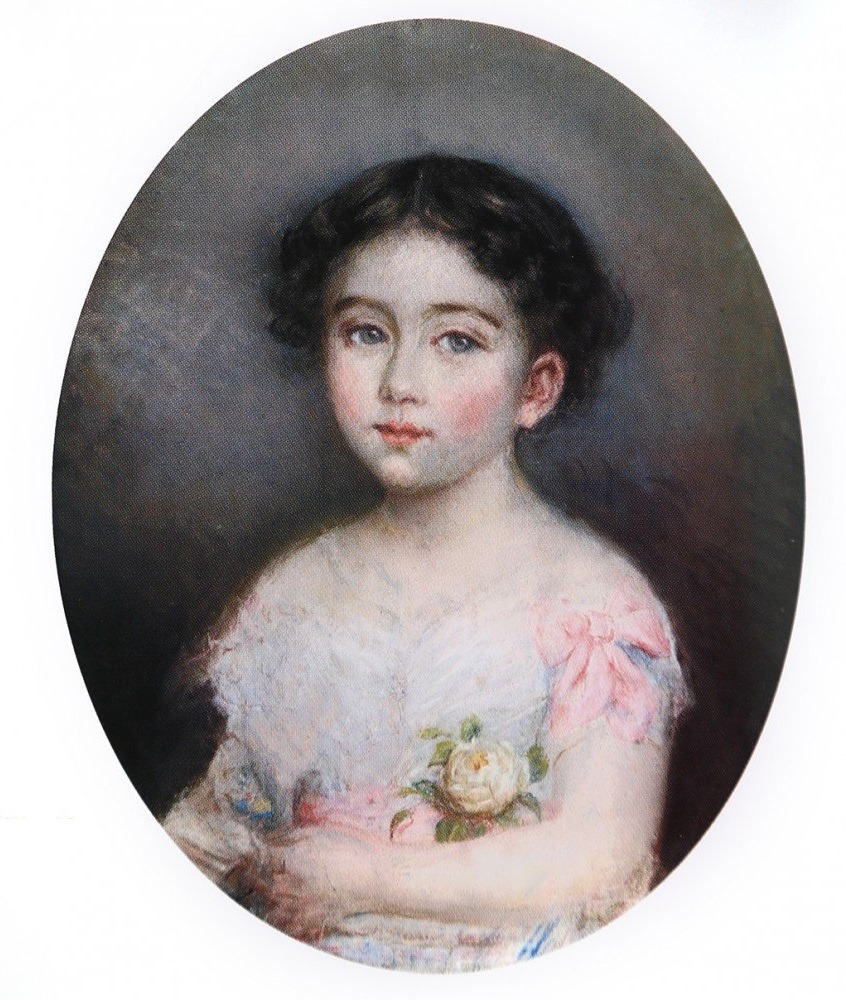
Portrait of a young Tatiana by Svetavel

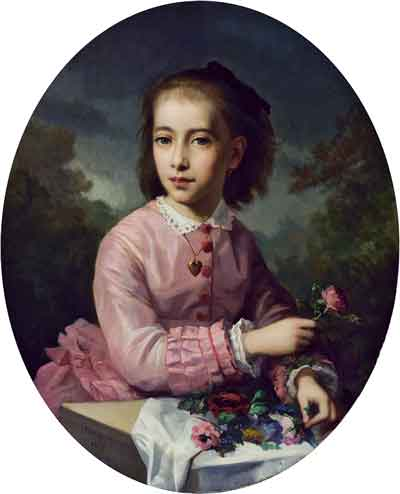
Portrait of Tatiana in 1875 by Jean-Baptiste Marie Fouque

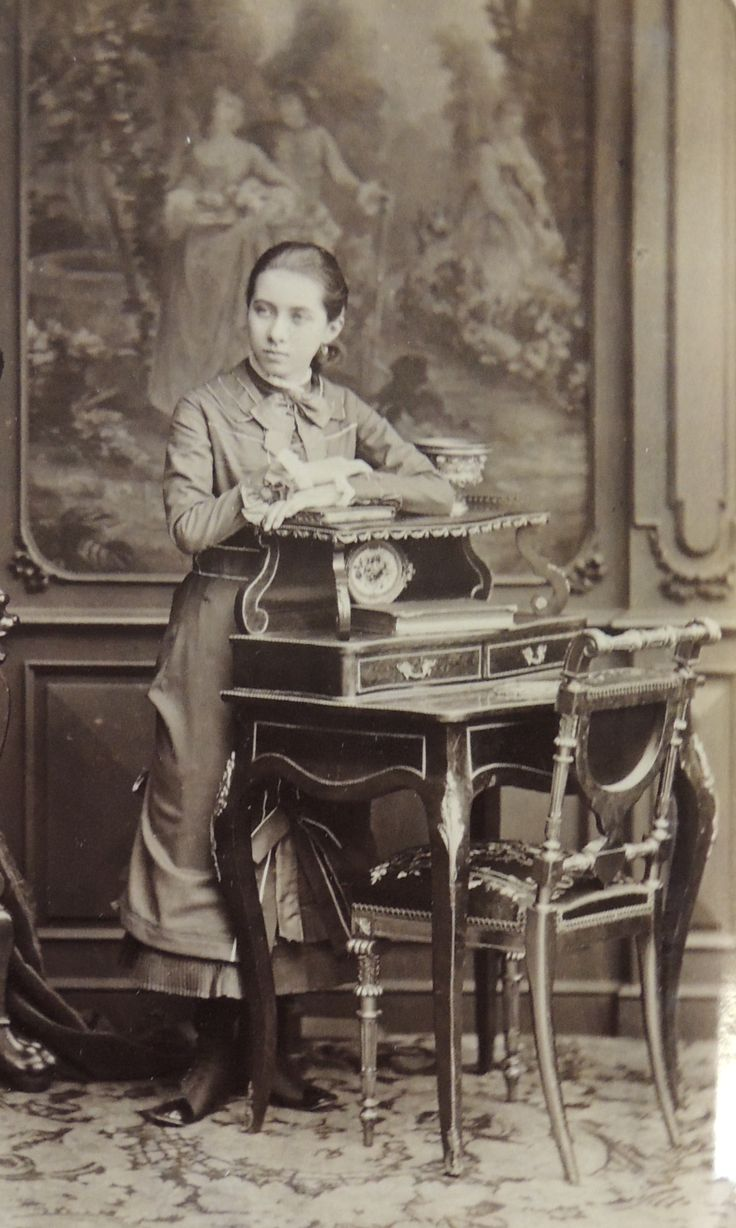
Tatiana as a child

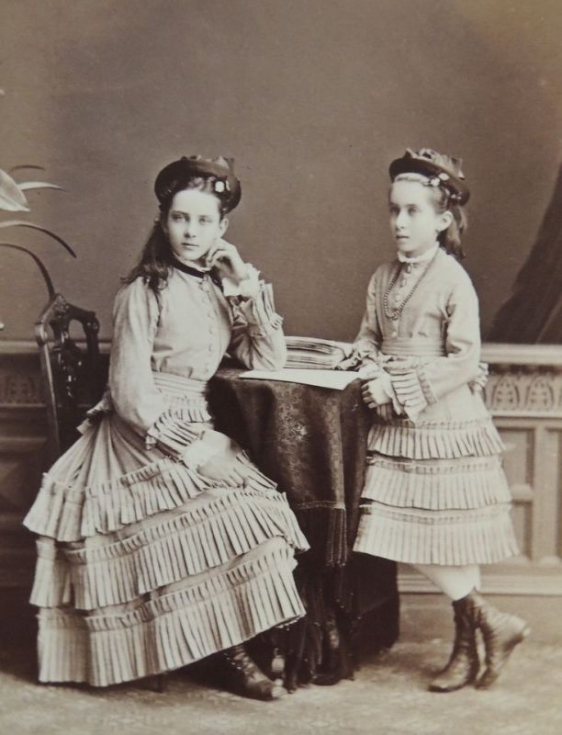
Tatiana and her older sister Zinaida

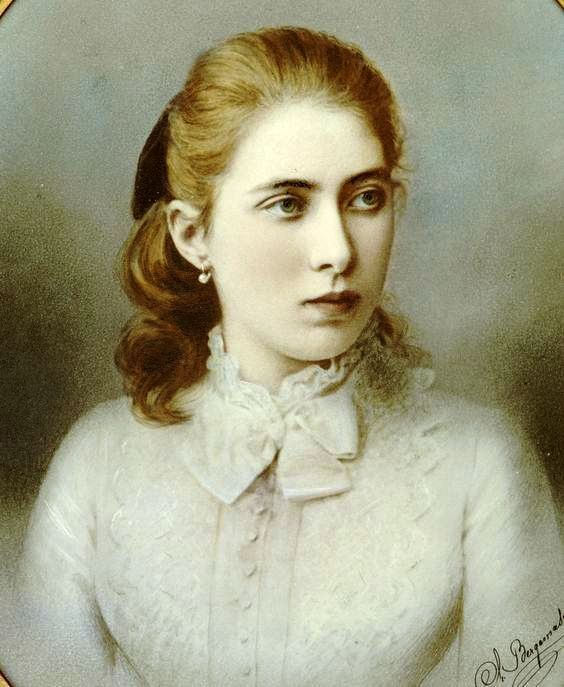
Tatiana as a young woman

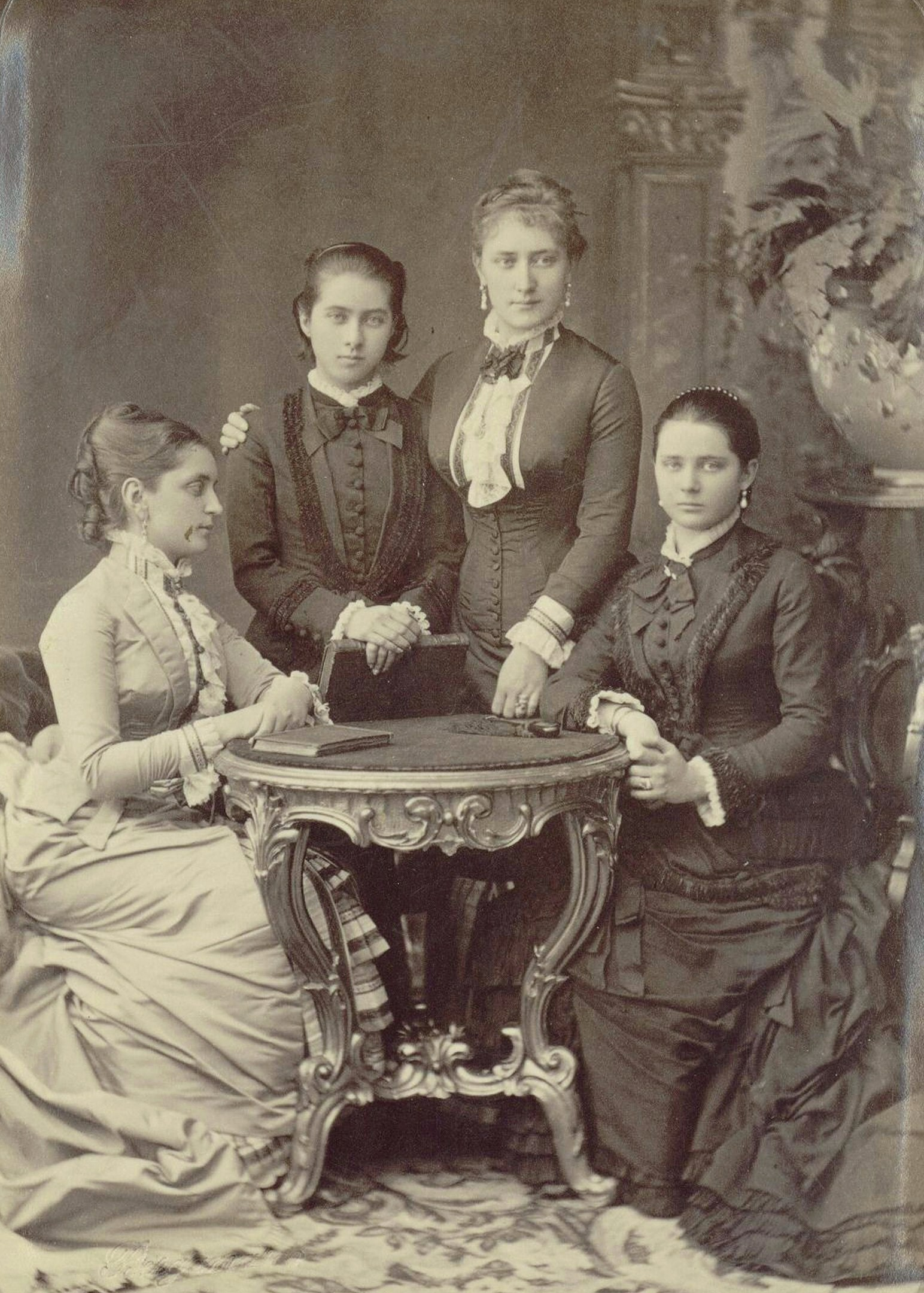
L-R: unknown woman, Tatiana, her mother and sister

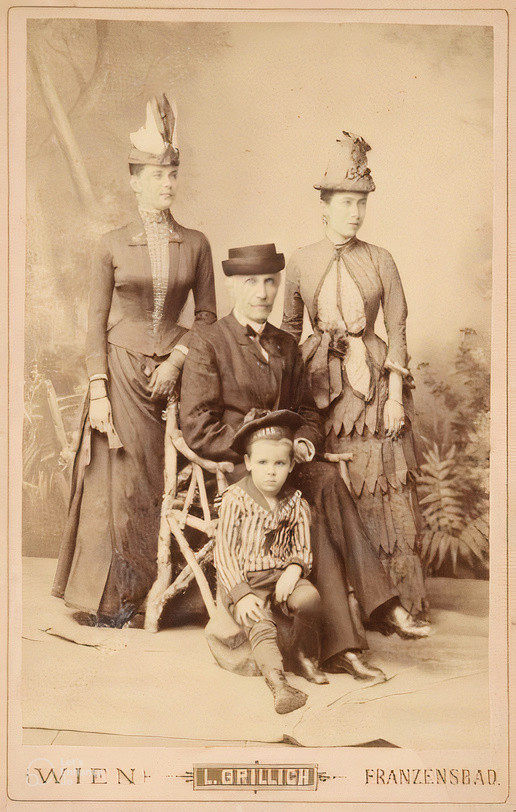
Yusupov family in 1886. L-R: Zinaida, Nicholas, Zinaida's son Nicholas and Tatiana

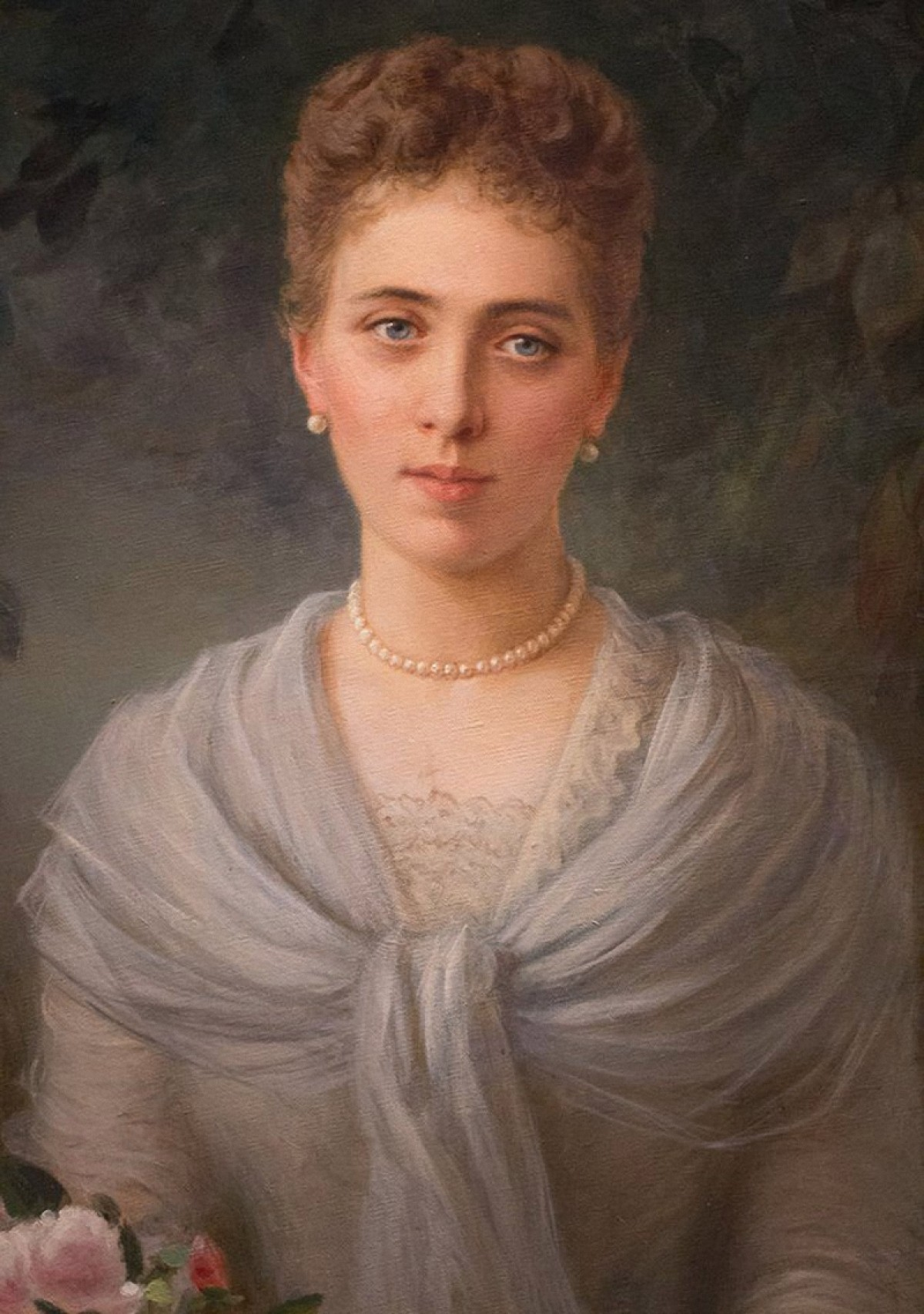
Portrait by Victor Schtember

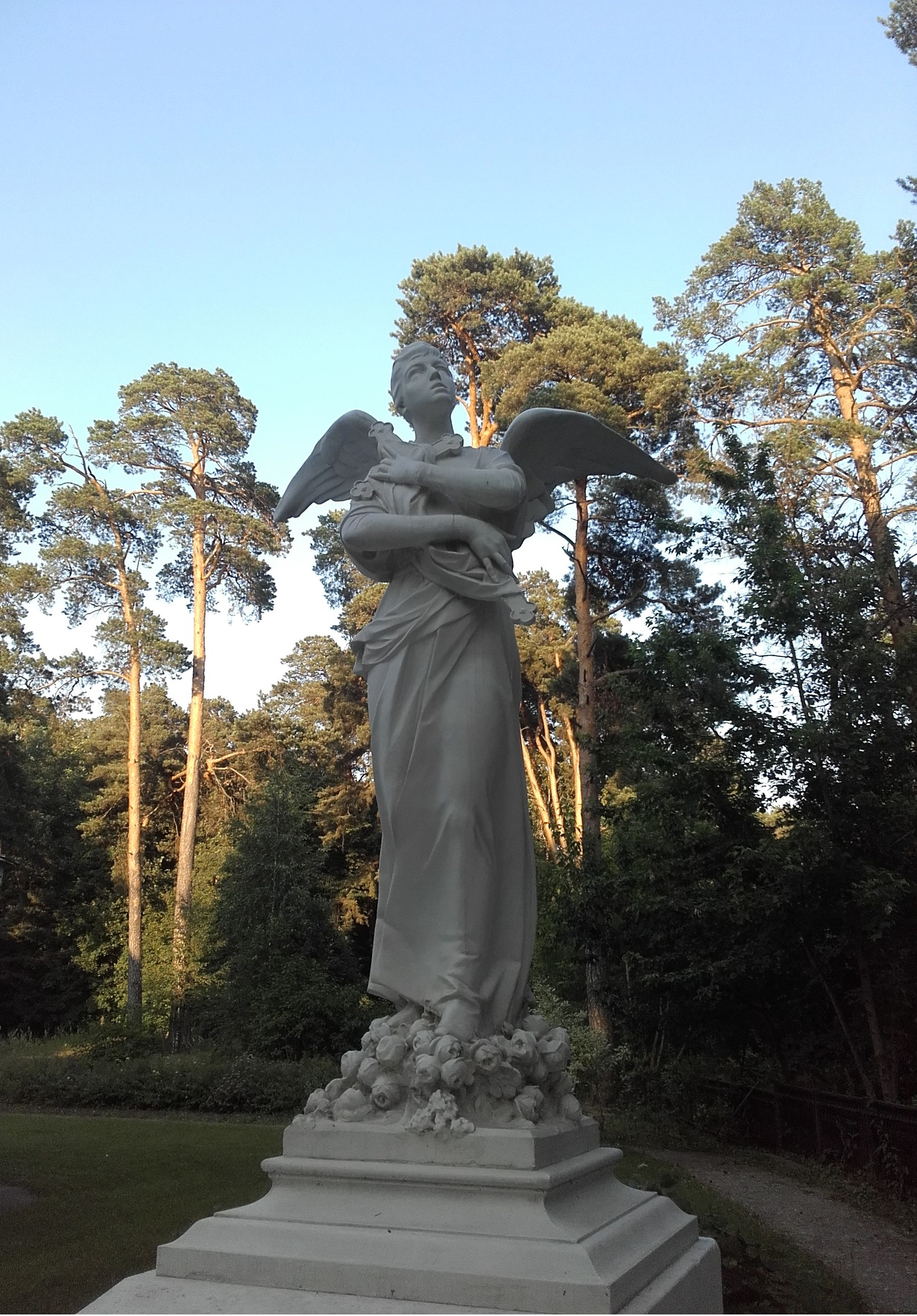
Statue and grave at Arkhangelskoye Palace

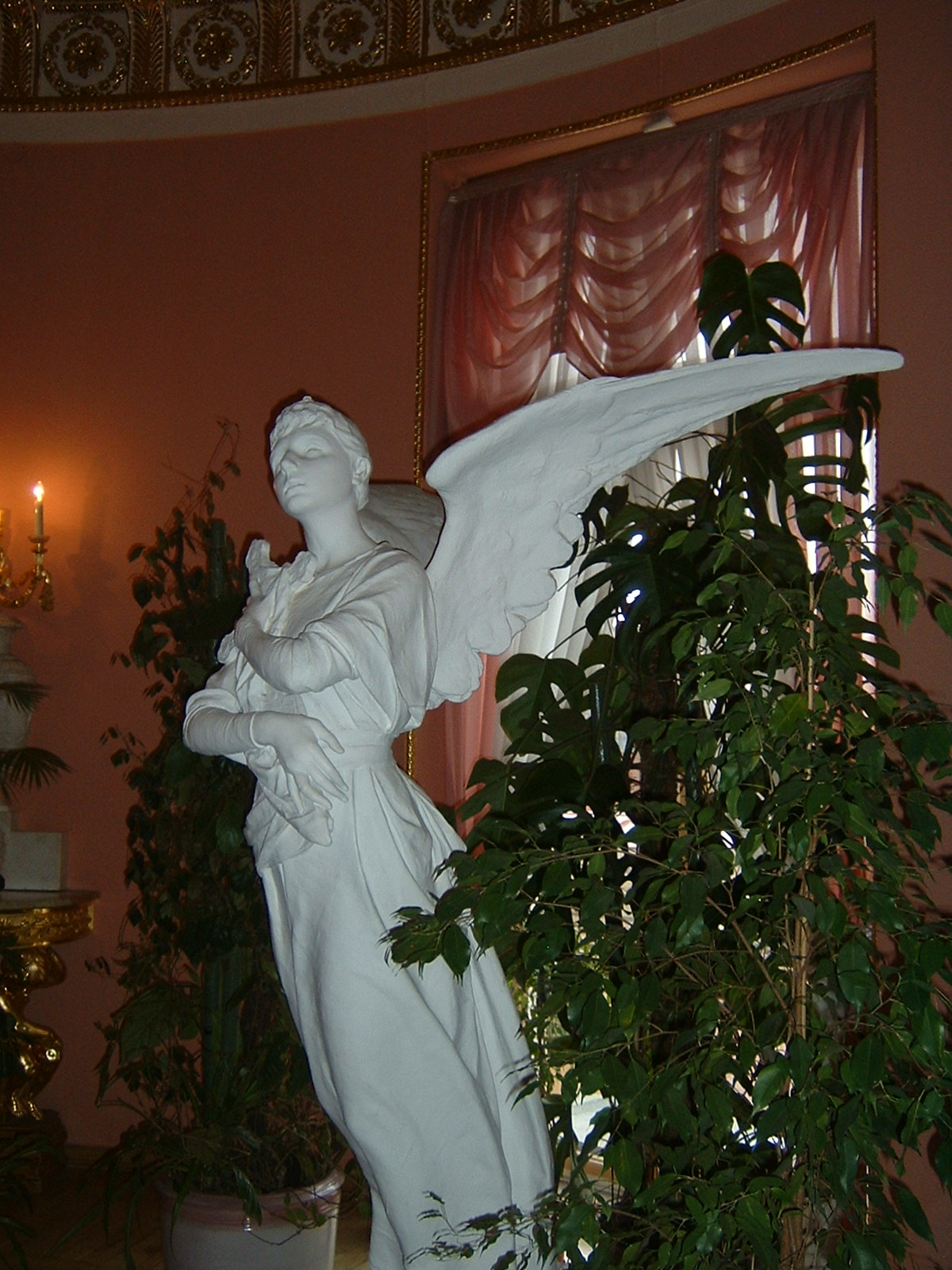
Copy of Tatiana's statue at the Moika Palace
