= Nikolay Yusupov =

Russian nobleman

Prince Nikolai Borisovich Yusupov
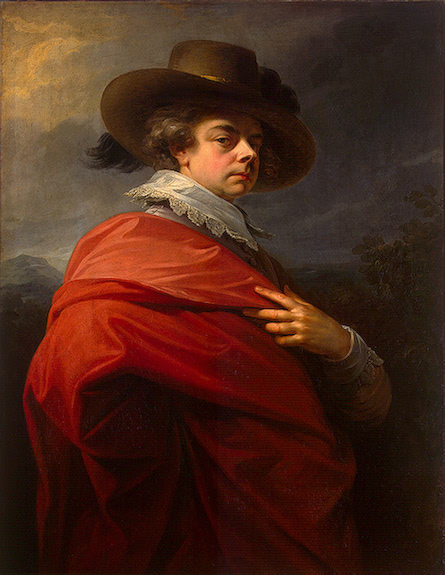
- Born: October 15, 1750
- Died: July 15, 1831 (aged 80)
- Spouse(s): Tatiana Vasilievna Yusupova (m. 1793)
- Children: Boris Nikolaevich Yusupov
- Parent(s): Boris Grigoryevich Yusupov; Irina Zinovieva
- Relatives: Eudokia Yusupova (older sister)

Prince Nikolai Borisovich Yusupov (Russian: Князь Никола́й Бори́сович Юсу́пов; 26 October [O.S. 15 October] 1750 – 15 July 1831) was a Russian nobleman and art collector of the House of Yusupov.

== Biography ==
He was the fifth child and only surviving son of Prince Boris Grigoryevich Yusupov (1695-1759). He served as a senator (from 1788), diplomat (from 1783 to 1789), Actual Civil Councillor (from 1796), Minister of State Properties (1800–16), a member of the Council of State (from 1823) and Director of Imperial Theatres (1791-1796) under a series of sovereigns, including Catherine the Great, Paul I, and Alexander I. He later also served as director of the Hermitage (in 1797), the Kremlin Armoury (date unknown) and the state porcelain and glass factories (c.1792).

A patron of the arts and a keen traveller, he spoke five languages and corresponded with Voltaire. As a diplomat, Prince Nikolai travelled throughout Europe, to France and Versailles, where he met Louis XVI and Marie Antoinette, to Germany and Prussia, where he met Frederick the Great, to Austria, where he met Emperor Joseph II, and to Italy. During his journey he purchased a large collection of art for the tsar, acting as a mediator between the tsars and European artists.

Yusupov collected for himself alongside collecting for the tsars, and thus his own collection of paintings and objets d'art evolved from the same sources as the Imperial one. His own collection became one of Europe's richest collections and included over 600 paintings (including many landscapes), sculptures, works of applied art, more than 20,000 books and porcelain, most of which he put on display in his estate. After 1917 his extensive collection was broken up and passed to several different museums, though the bulk of it is kept in Arkhangelskoye, the Hermitage and the Pushkin Museum. In 1804, Nicholas went to Paris and frequently met Napoleon, who presented him with a gift of three large tapestries. He also commissioned Sappho and Phaon from Jacques-Louis David in 1809.

In 1810 Yusupov bought Arkhangelskoye Estate, where he lived with his wife and family and which he turned into a luxurious palace, park and summer residence in Moscow. Prince Nicholas built his own porcelain factory there, with much of the artisans from France. He died aged 80 and was succeeded by his only remaining son, Prince Boris, since their other son, Prince Nikolai, died in infancy.

Some artworks from Prince Youssoupoff's collection

Rembrandt. Lady with an Ostrich-Feather Fan.

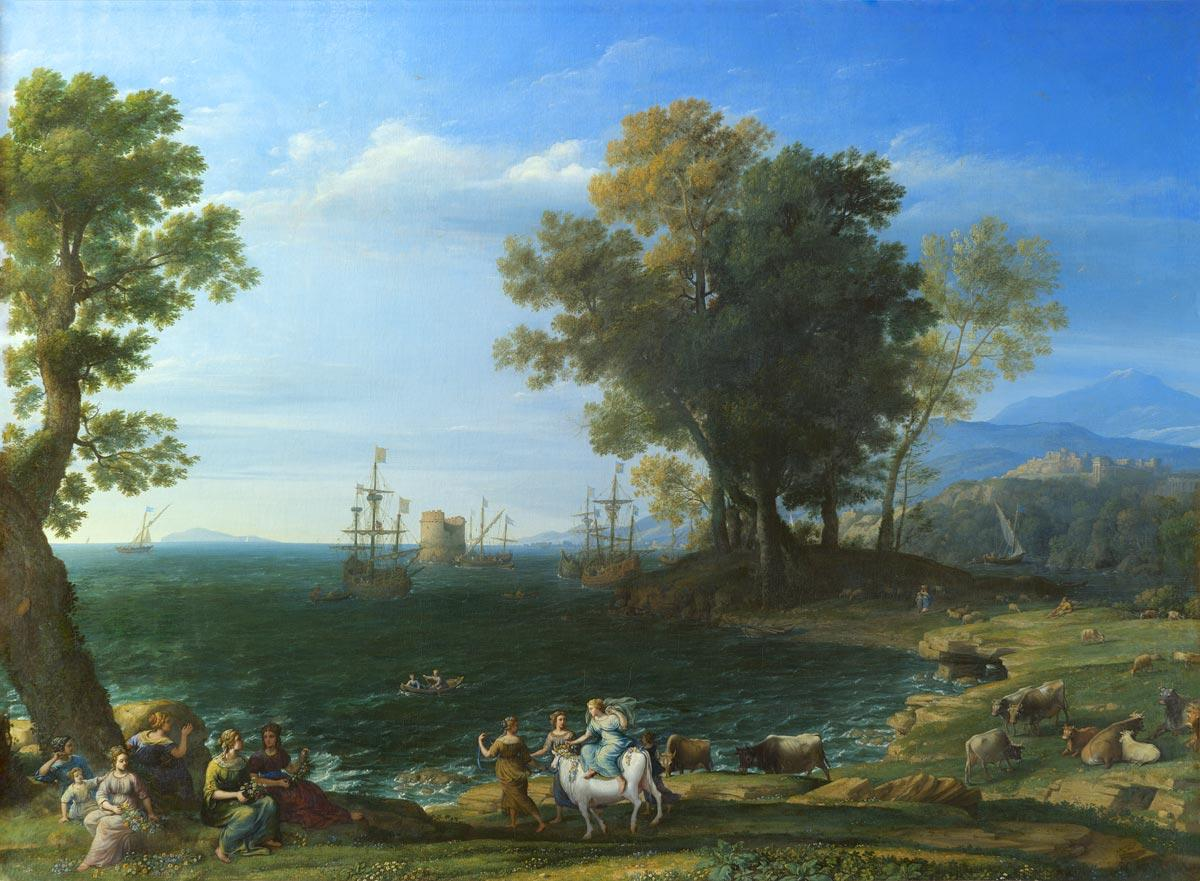
Claude Lorrain. The Rape of Europe

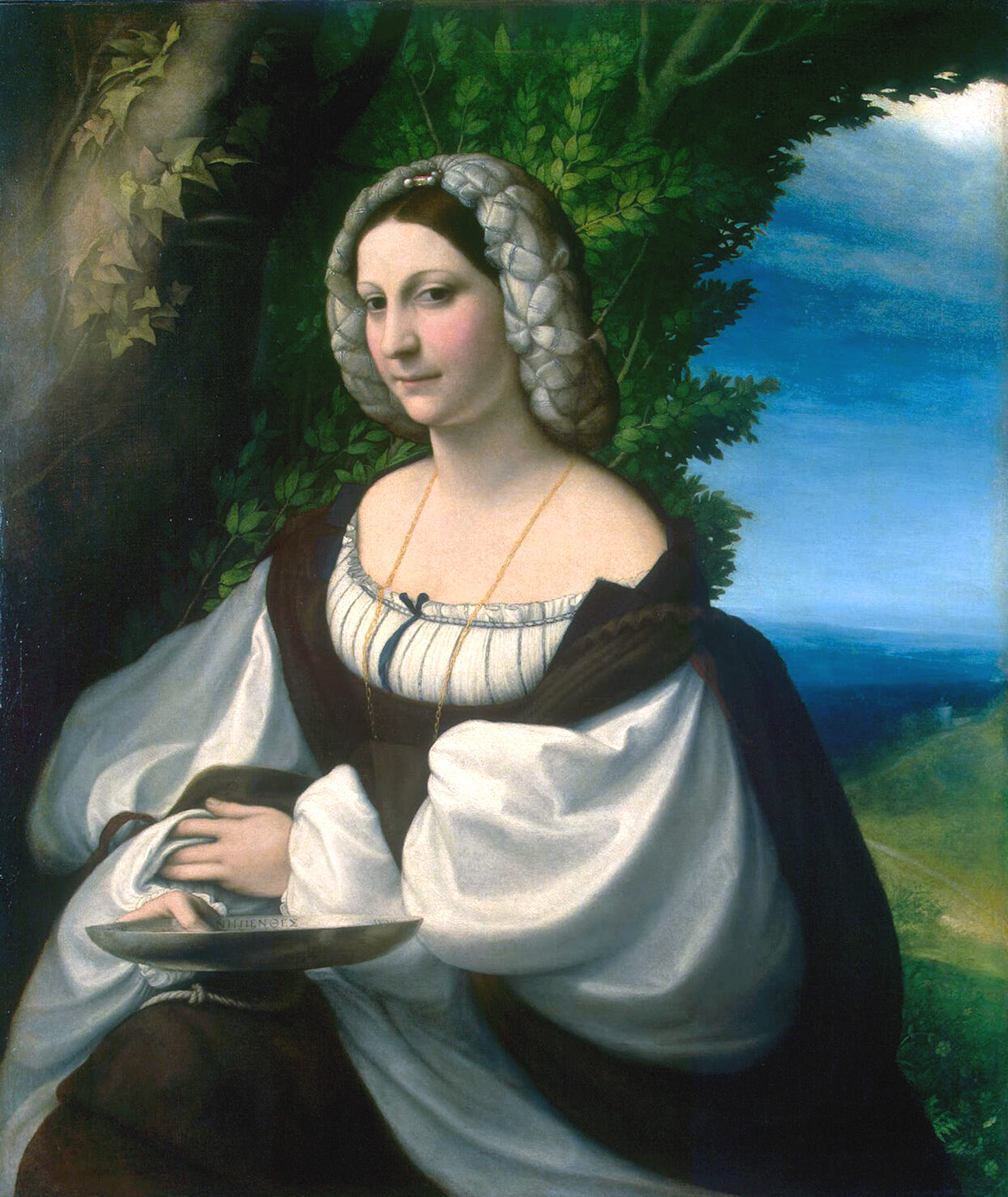
Correggio. Portrait of a Lady

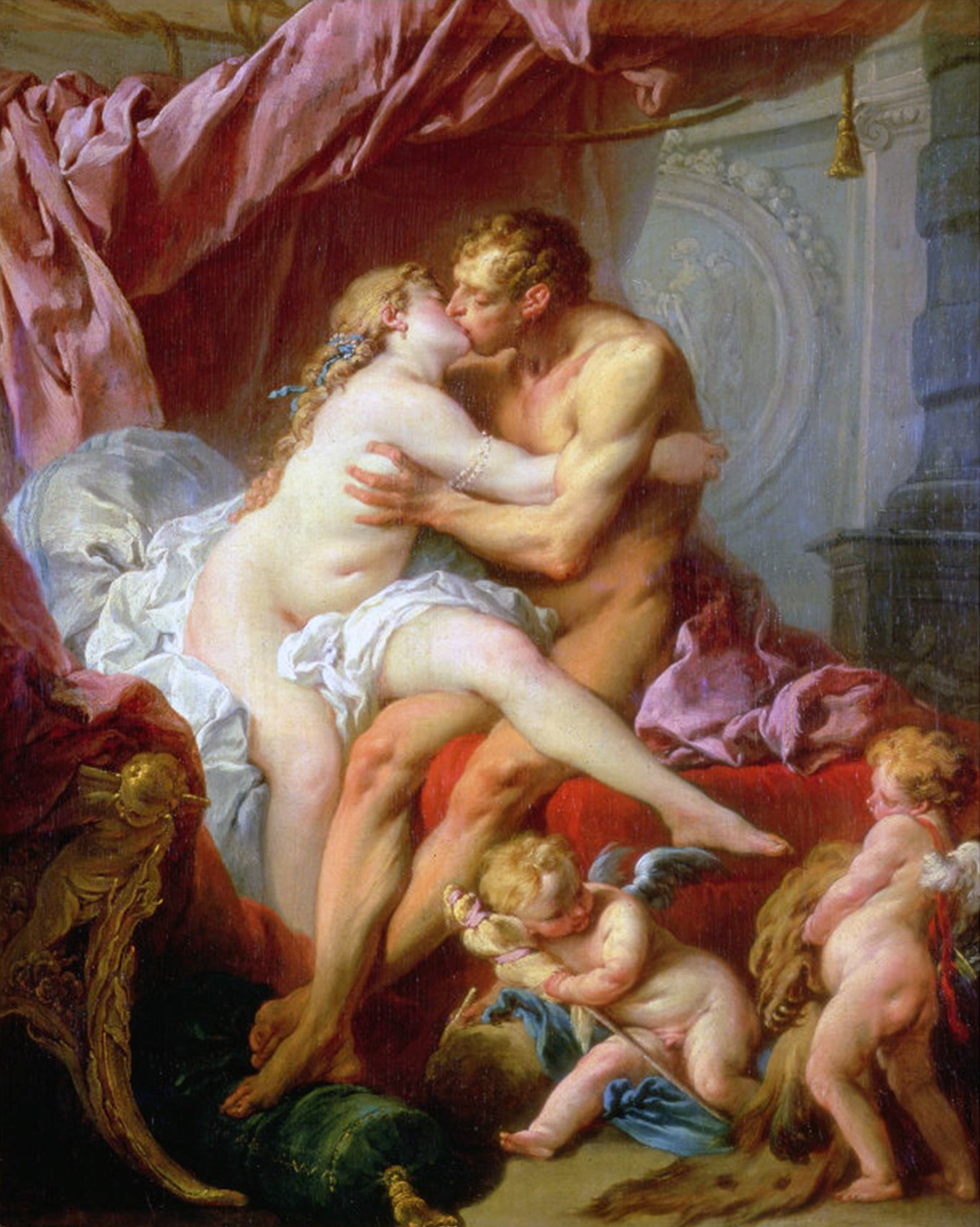
François Boucher. Hercules and Omphale

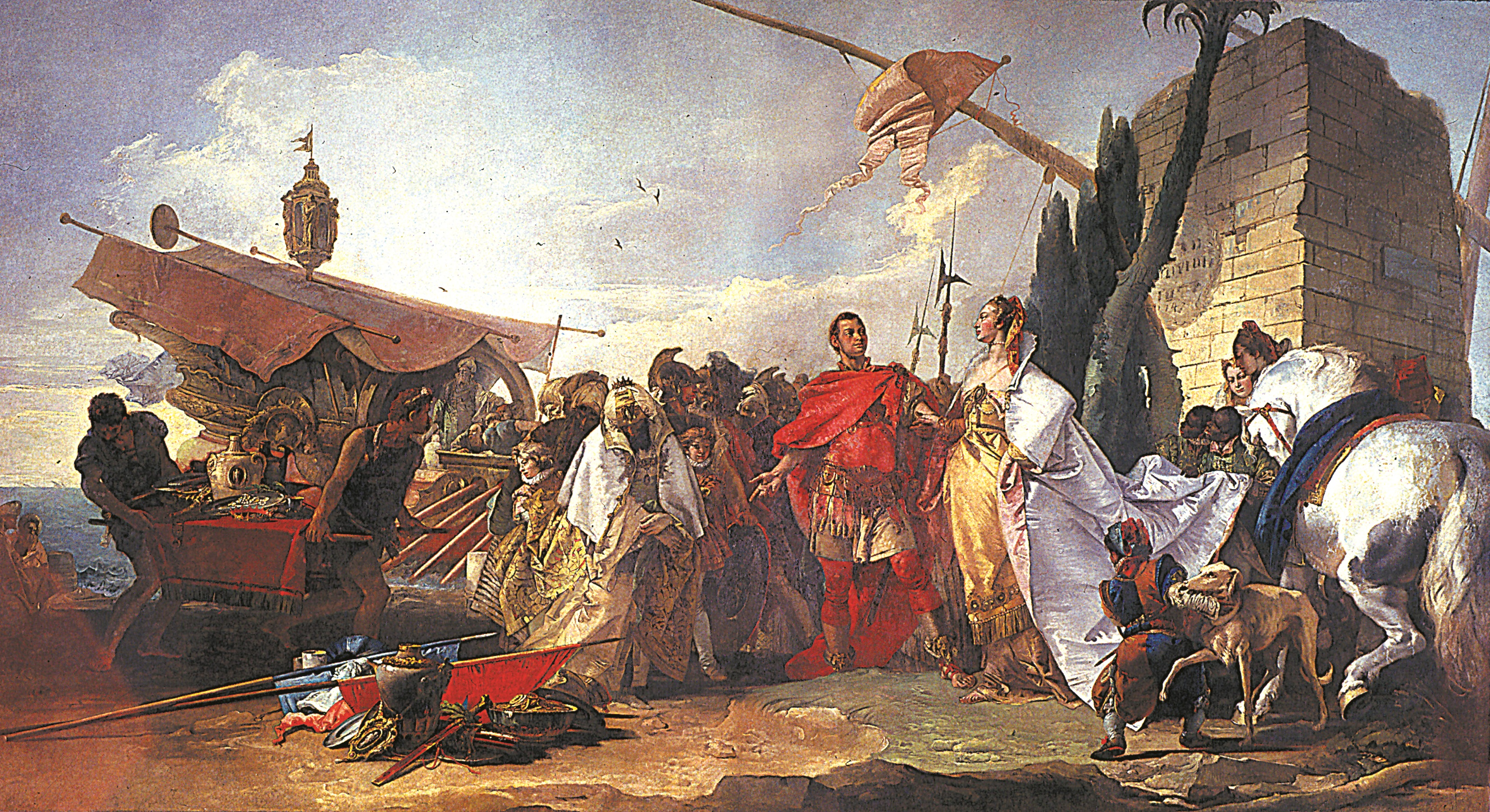
Giovanni Battista Tiepolo. Antony and Cleopatra.

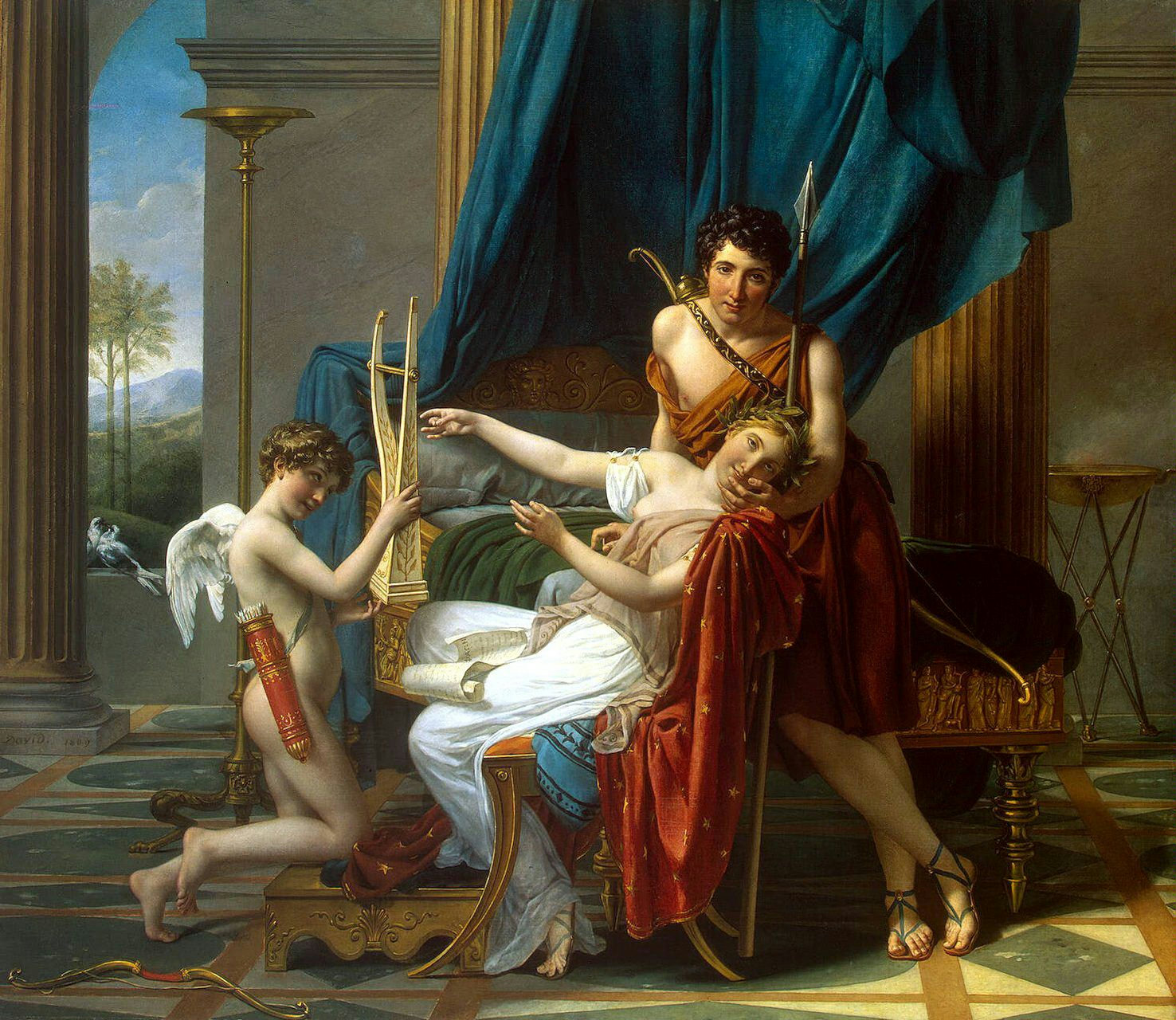
Jacques-Louis David. Sappho and Phaon

== Marriage and issue ==
In 1793 Nikolai married Tatiana Vasilievna von Engelhardt (January 1, 1769 – May 23, 1841), one of Prince Potemkin's nieces, and the widow of Mikhail Sergeevich Potemkin. Their children were:

- Boris Nikolaevich Yusupov (20 July 1794 – 6 November 1849)
- Nikolai Nikolaevich Yusupov (1795-1796)
- Maria Nikolaevna Yusupova (1802, died in infancy)

== Ancestry ==
=== Patrilineal descent ===
Patrilineal descent

Nikolai Borisovich Yusupov's patriline is the line from which he is descended father to son.

House of Yusupov

1. Baltychak, d. ca. 1378
2. Edigu, 1352-1419
3. Nuraddin Khan, d. ca. 1422
4. Akhaz Khan d. ca. 1447
5. Musa Khan, d. ca. 1502
6. Yusuf Khan, d. 1554
7. Elyas Mirza, d. 1611
8. Seyush Mirza, d. 1656
9. Dmitry Seyushevich Yusupov (Abdul Mirza), d. 1694
10. Grigory Dmitriyevich Yusupov, 1676–1730
11. Boris Grigoryevich Yusupov, 1695–1759
12. Nikolay Borisovich Yusupov, 1750-1831
