= Nikolai Borisovich Yusupov (junior) =

Russian landowner (1827–1891)

Prince Nicholas Borisovich Yusupov
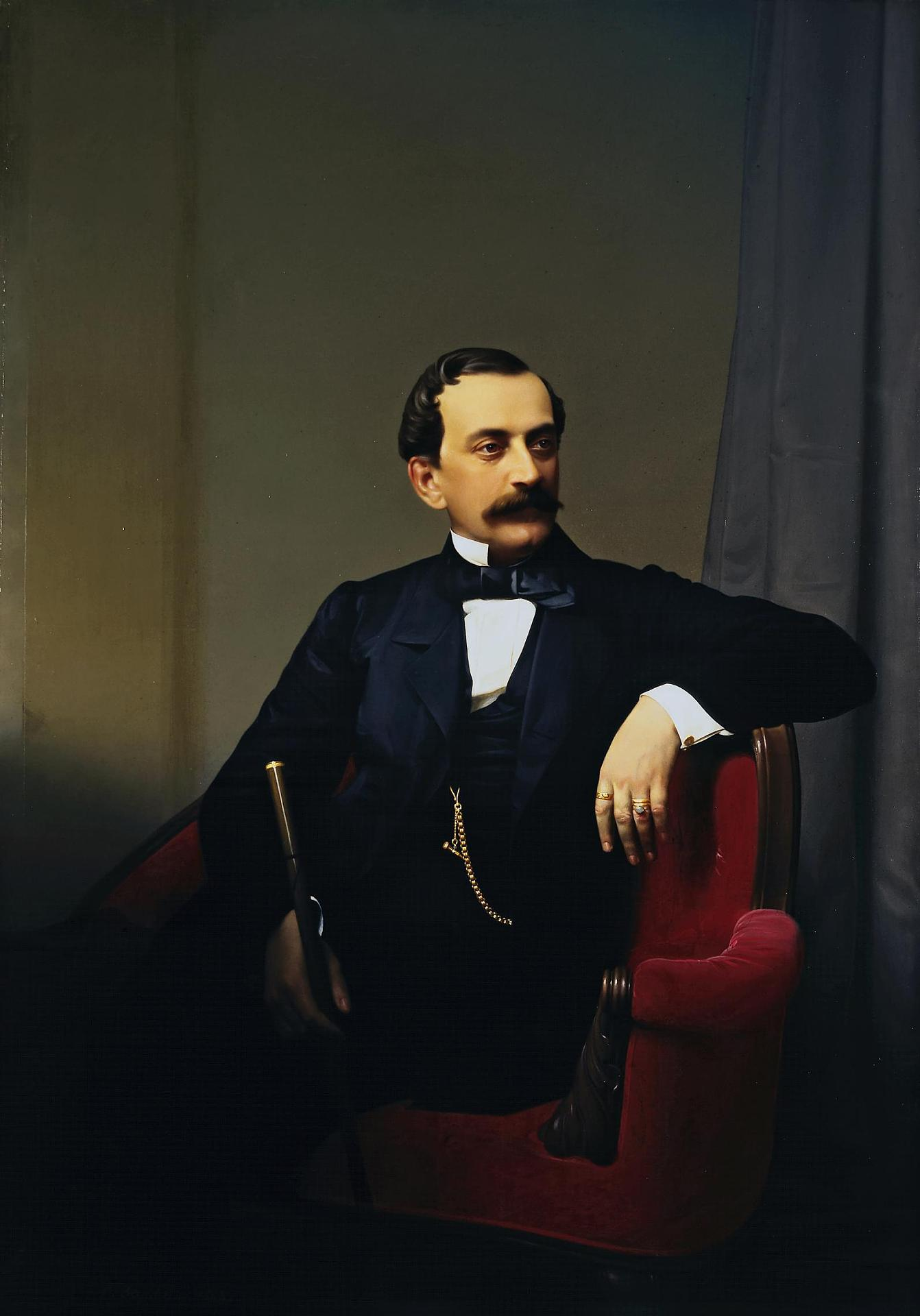
- Born: October 24, 1827; Saint Petersburg, Russian Empire
- Died: July 31, 1891 (aged 63); Baden-Baden
- Education: Saint Petersburg State University
- Occupations: Philanthropist, Collector
- Spouse: Princess Tatiana Alexandrovna Yusupova (m. 1856; died 1879)
- Children: Princess Zinaida Yusupova; Prince Boris Yusupov; Princess Tatiana Yusupova
- Parents: Boris Nikolaevich Yusupov (father); Zinaida Ivanovna Yusupova (mother)

Prince Nicholas Borisovich Yusupov (Russian: Князь Никола́й Бори́сович Юсу́пов—младший; 24 October 1827 – 31 July 1891) was one of the wealthiest landowners in the Russian Empire, as well as a musician, philanthropist, Active State Councillor (1864) and Chamberlain (1875). He was the maternal grandfather of Felix Yusupov.

== Biography ==
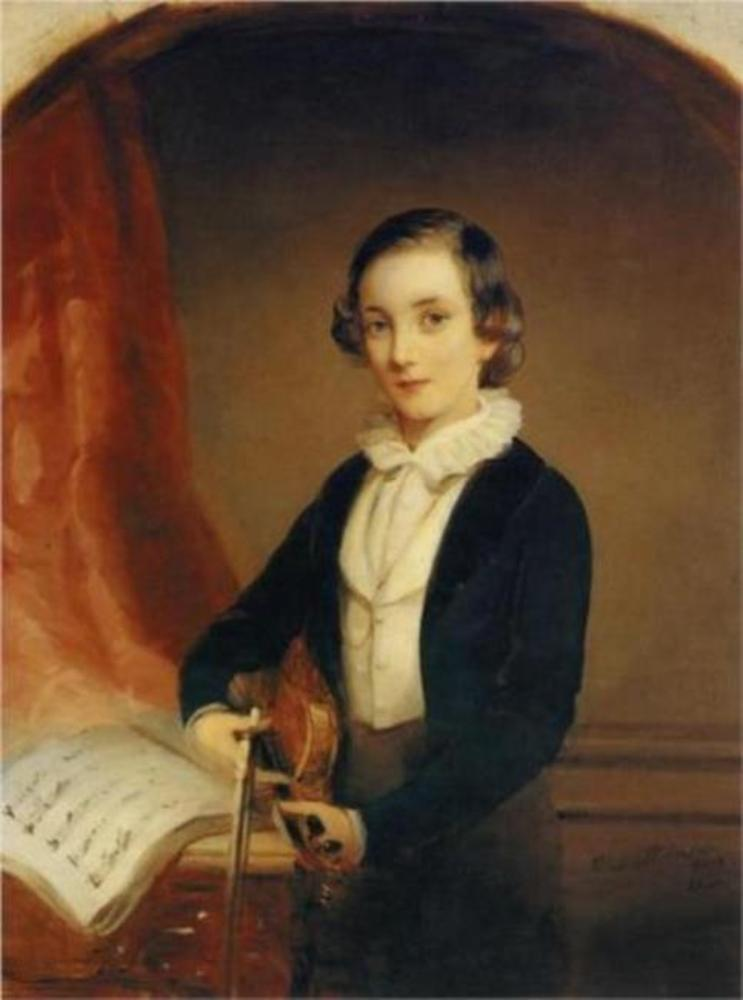
Portrait of Prince Nikolai, aged 12, by Christina Robertson

Born 24 October 1827 to Boris Nikolaevich and Zinaida Ivanovna Yusupova, born Naryshkina. His grandfather, who he was named after, wrote: "The wife of my son, Princess Zinaida Ivanovna, has been safely delivered in Saint Petersburg of their son, my grandson, Prince Nikolai Borisovich." He was christened on 13 November at the Saint Nicholas Naval Cathedral, with Emperor Nicholas I and his paternal grandmother as godparents.

Art and music were both important subjects of his education. His father, Prince Boris wrote: "Other than me and your mother, who care only for your happiness, may your first friends be your violin and your paintbrush. These will not betray you."

Yusupov was a skilled violinist. He was tutored by the Belgian violinist Henri Vieuxtemps (1820–1881), composed pieces for the piano and violin and authored several books on the subject of music. He was an honorary member of the Roman Academy of Music, the Philharmonic Academy of Bologna and the Paris Conservatory.

In 1849, his father died and at age twenty-two Nikolai Yusupov inherited the entire Yusupov fortune. The year after, he graduated from Saint Petersburg State University, Faculty of Law and was admitted to His Imperial Majesty's Own Chancellery as a secretary. He was banished to the Caucasus in 1852 for trying to elope with his half-cousin, Princess Tatiana Ribopierre.

In June 1856 he was back in favour and created Master of Ceremony at Emperor Alexander II's coronation. That same year, Nikolai married Tatiana. The marriage was originally deemed illegal, because of the bride and groom being too closely related according to Russian law, but the union was legalised by order of Alexander II. The pair had two daughters, Zinaida (1861) and Tatiana (1866) and a son in 1863, who died at three months old.

From 1862 to 1868, Yusupov was a manager of the Public Library of Saint Petersburg. He used his position to research his family history, the results of which he published in his 1866 and 1867 essays. The Yusupov family spent most of its time abroad to improve Princess Tatiana's failing health. Nevertheless, she died in 1879 aged only 51. Nine years later, his daughter of the same name died from typhoid. Knowing the Yusupov line would die with him in the male line, Yusupov filed a request to bequeath his land, surname and title to his son-in-law, Count Felix Elston, husband of his only surviving child Zinaida. On 15 October 1884, the request was approved by the Government Senate, on the condition that the transfer would only occur after Prince Nikolai's death.

Yusupov died from a heart attack in Baden-Baden on July 31, 1891, aged 63. He was survived by his mother, daughter and two grandsons. He was buried at the Alexander Nevsky Lavra monastery.

== Charity ==
Prince Yusupov was involved with charities from childhood. His father once wrote to him: "My dear friend, always be a noble person, and fulfil your religious duties. Be a person whose behaviour and acts can lead to nothing but good, and you will be your parents' comfort and pride."

In memory of his father, Yusupov sponsored two scholarships for Russian literature and Russian history while studying at the Saint Petersburg State University. During the Crimean War, in 1854, Yusupov personally financed two infantry battalions. During the Russo-Turkish War (1877–1878), he paid for a hospital train to treat wounded soldiers. Prince Yusupov was a trustee of the Alexander Marinsky School for the Deaf from 1881 onwards, and an honorary member of both the Demidov House of Charity and the Red Cross. He was the primary guardian of the Organisation of Dowager Empress Maria Feodorovna's Charities.

== Published essays ==
- Luthomonographie historique et raisonnée (Brussels, 1856);
- La Question du Jour en Russie e'clairee par des faits historiques par LPNJ (Berlin, 1861);
- Histoire de la Musique en Russie... (Paris, 1862);
- About the family of the Yusupov Princes... Part 1-2. (SPb., 1866–1867);
- Projects for the organisation of schools in Russia on new grounds (Frankfurt, 1879);
- For the opening of a prized match or the collecting of the history of emperor Alexander II (Frankfurt am Main, 1881);
- The Mysterious Reflection of the Divine Kingdom (M., 1882; 3d edition St. Petersburg, 1887);
- Spiritual Life (St. Petersburg, 1883);
- The suffering and the interpretation of the evangelicals by Count L. Tolstoy (St. Petersburg, 1883);
- Prophetic drawings: Religious and moral conclusions (St. Petersburg, 1883);
- I. S. Toergenjev: reflections and conclusions of the book (Berlin 1883).
- Clear Page of Life (Saint-Petersburg, 1884)
