= Boris Nikolaevich Yusupov =

Russian politician (1794–1849)

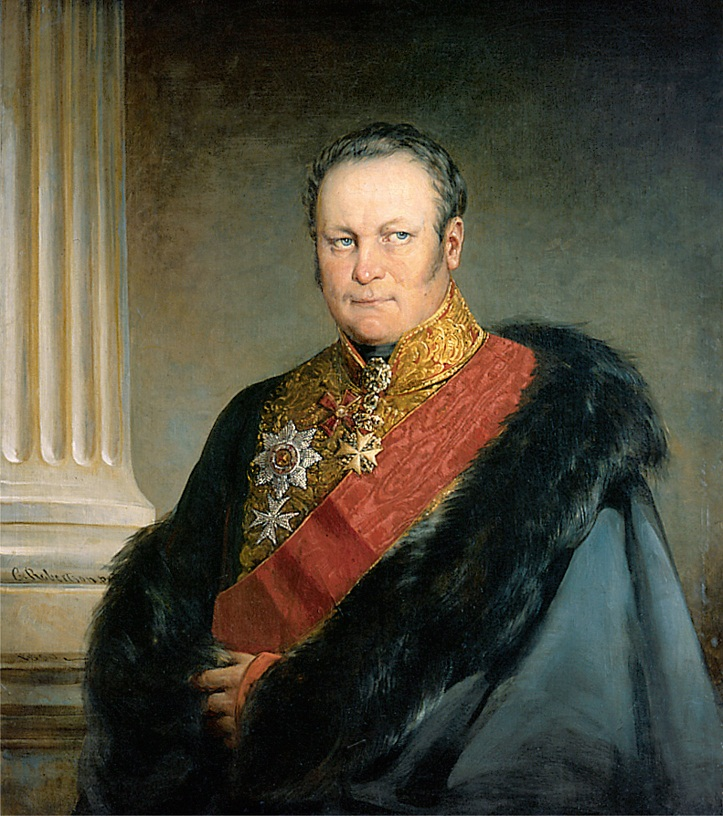
- Portrait by Christina Robertson, 1850
- Born: July 20, 1794; Saint Petersburg, Russia
- Died: November 6, 1849 (aged 55); Saint Petersburg, Russia
- Spouse(s): Praskovia Pavlovna Scherbatova (m. 1815; died 1820) Zinaida Ivanovna Naryshkina (m. 1827)
- Children: Nicholas Borisovich Yusupov
- Parents: Nikolay Yusupov (father); Tatiana Enghelhardt (mother)

Prince Boris Nikolaevich Yusupov (Russian: Борис Николаевич Юсупов; 20 July 1794 – 6 November 1849) was a Russian landowner, chamberlain and philanthropist. He was the heir and only son of Nikolai Borisovich Yusupov, and one of Russia's wealthiest aristocrats. He owned the Rakitnoye estate and was the first owner of the Moika Palace from the House of Yusupov.

== Biography ==
=== Childhood and Education ===
He was born in 1794 to Nikolai Yusupov and Tatiana Vasilievna Yusupova, the niece of Grigory Potemkin. His maternal half-siblings were Alexander Potemkin and Catherine, Duchess Ribeaupierre. He was named after his paternal grandfather, and his godfather was Tsar Paul I. To family and friends, he was known as "Borinka".

At first, he was educated at home by his mother. Then, he spent several years at a French school in Saint Petersburg run by Charles Dominque Nicol. After completing his education at the Institute of Pedagogy in Saint Petersburg, he was hired by the Ministry of Foreign Affairs in 1815. In 1817, he was appointed chamberlain.

=== Career ===
His unlimited wealth made Prince Yusupov independent, which made him less inclined to take his work seriously. He consistently argued with prominent figures and Count Modest Andreevich Korf wrote: "He has various bizarre eccentricities and a reputation for small-mindedness. He had no shame when expressing his thoughts and feelings, neither in public nor when with the tsar."

In 1824, Boris quit his job after his boss, Count Kapodistrias, resigned. He travelled through Europe for eighteen months, before he was tasked by the Emperor to deliver the body of Empress Elizabeth's body to Saint Petersburg, after she had died in Belyov. He was soon promoted to Master of Ceremonies (1826) and Active State Councillor (1833). In 1839, he was appointed District Representative for Tsarskoye Selo and honorary guardian of the Saint Petersburg Home for Orphans and Widows. He was also a member of the Card Collection Expedition, which regulated playing cards.

=== Personal life ===
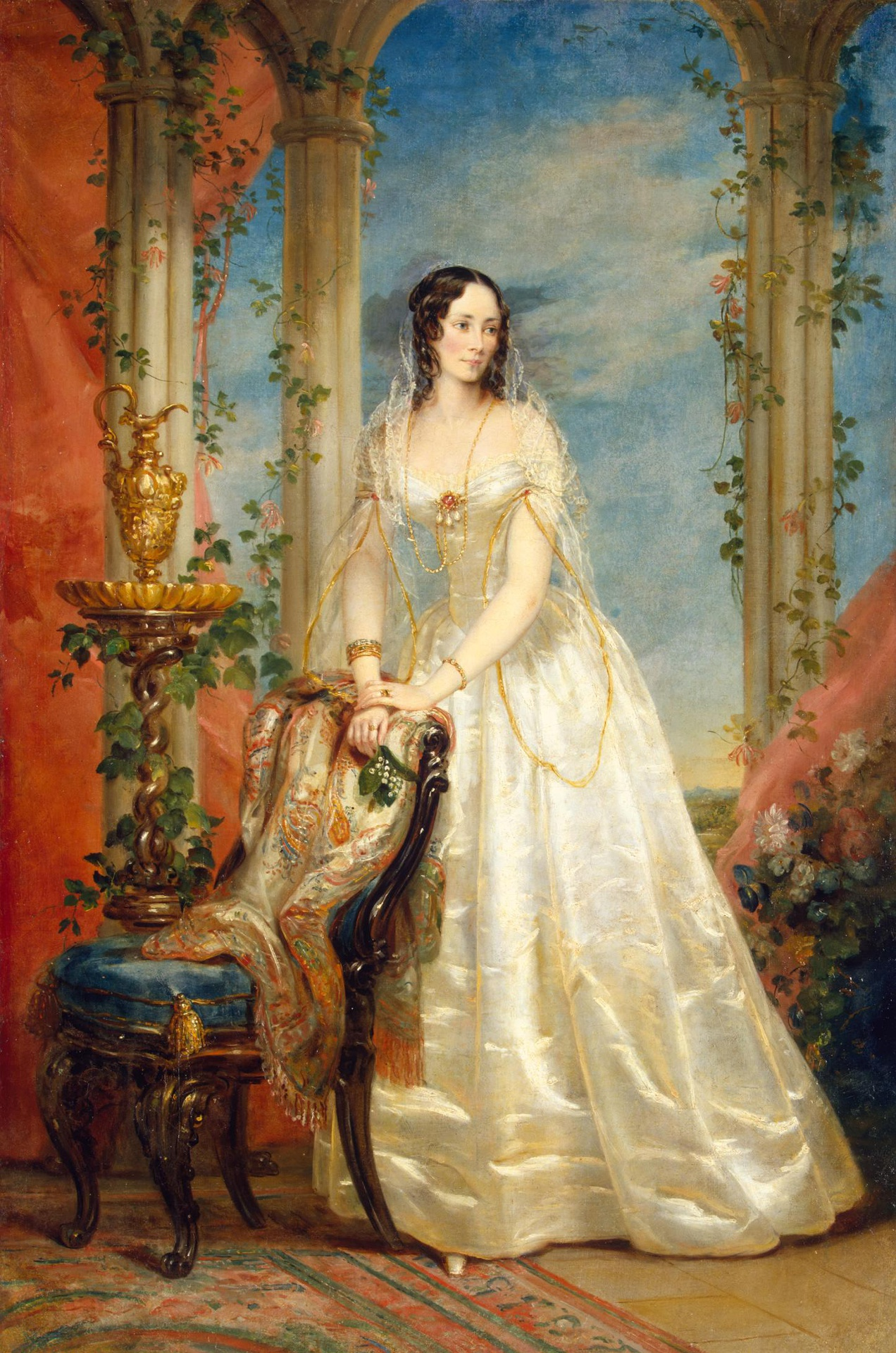
Boris' second wife, Zinaida Naryshkina

His first wife, Praskovia, bled to death after giving birth to a daughter Martha in 1820. The girl died after only six days. In 1826, 32-year-old Boris fell in love with 15-year-old Zinaida Naryshkina. They married the year after and had two children: a son Nikolai (1827) and a stillborn child named Anastasia (1829). After the stillbirth, relations between the couple soured and Princess Zinaida began an affair with a young officer named Nikolai Gervais, as well as Tsar Nicholas I.

In 1830, he bought the Moika Palace from his maternal aunt, Sanechka Branitskaya for 250.000 rubles. When his father died from cholera in 1831, Boris inherited 250.000 hectares of land, 40.000 serfs and a debt of over 2,5 million rubles. To save his finances, Boris set out to turn his estate, Arkhanghelskoye, into a profit-making concern. He removed most of the works of art to Saint-Petersburg, sold the animals from its zoological gardens and dismissed its actors, dancers and musicians.

He donated 73.300 rubles to the board of public charity in Saint Petersburg.

=== Final years ===
In 1849, he was tasked with organising the Saint Petersburg Industrial Exhibition. During the busy preparations, Prince Boris fell ill. He died of gout in 1849. He was buried in Dolgoprudny, his grave reading: Here lies the Russian nobleman, Boris Yusupov, son of Prince Nikolai Yusupov. 1794-1849. L'Honneur avant tout. The final line was his favourite saying in French, meaning "Honour above all".

== Legacy ==
His great-grandson, Felix Yusupov, wrote in his memoirs:

"He was far from possessing his father's personality and had quite a different nature. His independence, integrity and great frankness brought him more enemies than friends. Neither rank nor fortune played any part in his choice of friends; all that mattered to him was their worth and honesty. On one occasion, when he was about to entertain the Czar and Czarina, the court minister struck out several names on the list of guests. The Prince refused to accept this. "When I have the great honor of receiving my Emperor," he said. "all my friends should be considered fit to share it." During the famine of 1854, Prince Boris made himself responsible for the maintenance of the peasants. Naturally, he was adored by them."
