= Zinaidino =

Zinaidino Зинаидино
- Selo
- Location within Belgorod Oblast Location within Russia
- Coordinates: 50°53′N 35°54′E
- Country: Russia
- Region: Belgorod Oblast
- District: Rakityansky District
- Time zone: UTC+3:00

Zinaidino (Russian: Зинаидино) is a rural locality (a selo) and the administrative center of Zinaidinskoye Rural Settlement, Rakityansky District, Belgorod Oblast, Russia. The population was 703 as of 2010. There are 12 streets.

== Geography ==
Zinaidino is located 8 km northeast of Rakitnoye (the district's administrative centre) by road. Novozinaidinskoye is the nearest rural locality.
