= Jean-Baptiste Marie Fouque =

French painter (1819–1880)

- Born: July 2, 1819; Arles, France
- Died: 11 April 1880 (aged 60); Lorient, France
- Education: François Huard; Léon Cogniet
- Known for: Painting

Jean-Baptiste Marie Fouque (July 2, 1819 – April 11, 1880), also anglicised as Jean Marius Fouque or Marius Fouque, was a French painter specialising in portraits and mythological subjects.

== Biography ==
Born in Arles in 1819, the son of the locksmith Honorat Fouque and Marguerite Barbier, Jean-Baptiste studied painting under the Arlesian painter and archaeologist François Huard. He was awarded a scholarship from the city council of Arles to study at the Beaux-Arts de Paris. There, he studied under the direction of Joseph-Léon de Lestang-Parade and Léon Cogniet. In 1854 he married Marie Perrine Leray, a seamstress from Rennes. The couple had two sons: Émile, born in 1849, and Adrien, born in 1855.

The first exhibition of Fouque's art was in 1846, and resulted in a steady stream of commissions for the government of the Second French Empire. He worked primarily as a copyist for the Ministry of State, and produced portraits of both Emperor Napoleon III and Empress Eugénie de Montijo, as well as many foreign nobles and royals such as Princess Tatiana Alexandrovna Yusupova of Russia. In 1864, he was named "painter to the king of Siam", and painted portraits, based on photographs, of King Mongkut (Rama IV), including one for the Siamese pavilion at the 1867 Paris Exposition. He also created a copy of Jean-Léon Gérôme's Reception of the Siamese Ambassadors, which was presented as a gift to Mongkut from Napoleon III's government.

In addition to his portraiture, Fouque painted many allegorical and religious works. In 1863, he returned to Arles to paint several altarpieces and other works for the Church of Saint Trophime and the Church of Saint Cesaire.

== Collections ==
Several of Fouque's paintings are in the collection of the Hermitage Museum.

== Notable works ==
- The Sculptor Pradier, Museum of Art and History, Geneva
- Portrait of Rama V, Bang Pa-In Royal Palace, Thailand
- Portrait of Tatiana Alexandrovna Yusupova, State Museum of the History of St. Petersburg
- The Assumption and The Meeting at the Golden Gate, Chapel of Saint Anne, Church of Saint Cesaire, Arles
- Saint Cesaire at the bedside of the prefect of Ravenna, Church of Saint Trophime, Arles
- Purgatory, Chapel for the Souls in Purgatory, Church of Saint Cesaire, Arles

=== Attributed works ===
- Virgin of the Immaculate Conception, Church of Saint Trophime, Salin-de-Giraud (Bouches-du-Rhône)
- Saint Trophime of Arles, Church of Saint Trophime, Arles
