= Hercules and Omphale (Boucher) =

18th-century painting by François Boucher

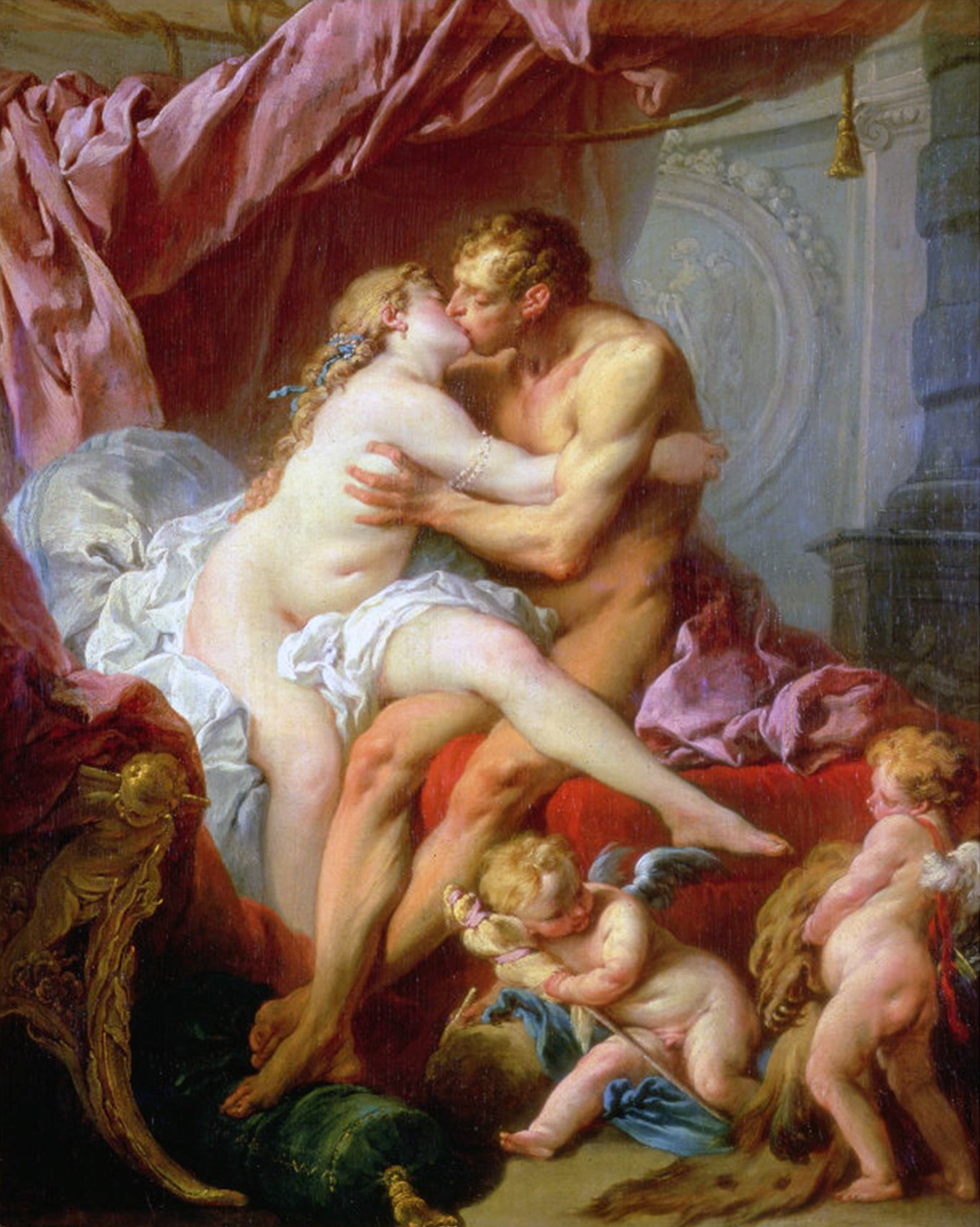
Arist / François Boucher; Year / c. 1731-1734; Medium / Oil on canvas; Dimensions / 90 cm x 74 cm (35.4 in x 29.1 in); Location / Pushkin Museum

Hercules and Omphale is an oil-on-canvas painting by French painter François Boucher, likely completed sometime between 1731 and 1734. The painting depicts the mythological romance between the Greek hero Hercules and Omphale, queen of Lydia. The painting represents an important work from Boucher's early career, completed shortly after his studies under his mentor François Lemoyne.

After its creation in the 1730s, the painting appears to have remained in Boucher's possession. It was later acquired by Pierre-Louis-Paul Randon de Boisset before passing to Philippe-Guillaume Boullogne de Préninville at auction in 1777. It was then acquired by the comte de Vaudreuil in 1787. In the nineteenth, it became part of the Yusupov family collection in Saint Petersburg, where it remained until 1930. Following the Russian Revolution and subsequent nationalization of aristocratic art collections, it was transferred to the Pushkin Museum in Moscow, where it remains on display today.

== Description ==
In a lavishly decorated boudoir, Hercules and Omphale are shown locked in a tender embrace atop a bed. Their meeting takes place beneath a quickly assembled canopy of red velvet. The room’s disheveled appearance—marked by scarlet fabric cascading from the bed and across a Rococo table, knocking over decorative objects—accentuates the intensity of their passion. On the floor, a green velvet cushion with golden tassels has landed and now serves as a makeshift rest for Hercules’ feet. The British art historian Alastair Laing observes that the interaction between the two angels playfully mimics the relationship between the two central figures.

Boucher's interpretation of the Hercules and Omphale myth represents a departure from more conservative depictions prevalent in earlier periods, by emphasizing the sensual aspects of the myth rather than its moral dimensions. The work showcases Boucher's skill in creating compositions that balance classical subject matter with contemporary French tastes of the early 18th century.

Boucher's composition maintains clear visual indicators of each figure's identity while subverting traditional depictions of the Hercules myth. Rather than portraying Hercules as the typically muscular, dominant hero seen in classical art, Boucher presents him with a youthful appearance and barely developed beard. His immodest embrace of Omphale's right breast and their locked kiss reflect the uninhibited sexual energy Boucher sought to convey.

The painting's composition uses this visual disorder to heighten the dramatic and passionate elements of the scene, creating a stark contrast between the chaotic surroundings and the focused intensity of the lovers' embrace.

== Style, cultural context and interpretation ==
Boucher's painting departs from traditional depictions of the narrative, which emphasize the humiliation of Hercules and his servitude to Omphale. Boucher instead focuses on raw, mutual desire. By emphasizing the sensual aspects of the myth rather than its moral dimensions, the painting exemplifies the Rococo and its willingness to embrace of intimacy, pleasure, and decorative richness. The work showcases Boucher's skill in creating compositions that balance classical subject matter with contemporary French tastes of the early 18th century.

== Technical development and critiques ==
Technical examination of the painting reveals significant modifications during Boucher's creative process. The red velvet canopy appears to have been a late addition to the composition, as evidence suggests the undraped cord originally continued along the upper edge of the canvas, and more of the medallion's circular frame in the background was visible in earlier versions.

The painting exemplifies what Alexandre Benois described in 1910 as having "youth throughout" with a style closer to François Lemoyne and "even to the brutal frankness of Rubens than to the works of Boucher's own maturity." The catalog of the Randon de Boisset sale in 1777 similarly described the work as "in the style of François le Moine," reinforcing the perceived influence of Boucher's teacher.

The art historian Alastair Laing questioned the influence of Lemoyne on the work. Unlike Lemoyne's treatment of the same subject, which emphasized Hercules's enslavement to Omphale, Boucher placed the distaff and spindle in the hands of one of the cupids rather than Hercules himself, "leaving the hero free to indulge his ardor to the full." This compositional choice reflects Boucher's interest in emphasizing the passionate encounter over the traditional narrative elements of Hercules' servitude to Omphale. The painting's vibrant palette and handling of light concentrate on enhancing the emotional intensity rather than naturalistic representation. Laing observed that Boucher creates an "indoor picture of hothouse intensity" with color used "to intensify the conveyance of passion rather than to reflect the fall of light."

The composition shows what Diderot described in Boucher's early works as having "color [that] was forthright and true; his composition was sound, yet full of verve; his handling was broad and grand." This painting demonstrates the youthful vigor that characterizes Boucher's early period, which some critics like Benois suggested showed greater sensuality than his later, more mature works. Benois particularly noted that in enjoying this picture, we might regret "that Boucher 'found himself' later, and that he did not remain for the rest of his life the vigorous, full-blooded sensualist that we have here"—revealing the distinctive quality of this early work compared to Boucher's later, more refined style.

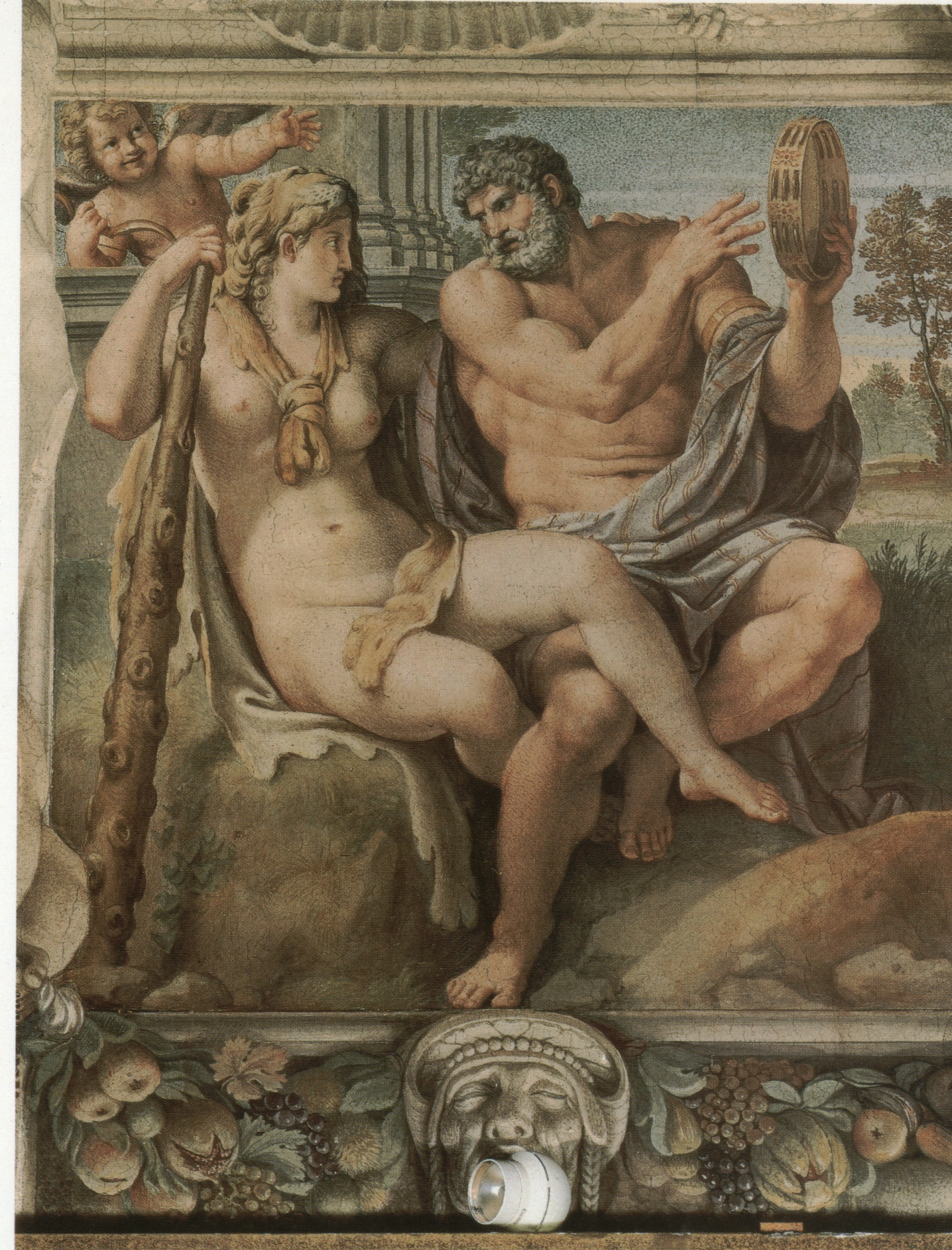
Omphale's posture, particularly her slung-over leg, draws inspiration from Annibale Carracci's "Hercules and Iole" on the Farnese Gallery ceiling.

== Artistic influences and references ==
Annibale Carracci's Hercules and Iole on the Farnese Gallery ceiling likely influenced Boucher's positioning of Omphale's leg over Hercules.
