= Christina Robertson =

Scottish painter (1796–1854)

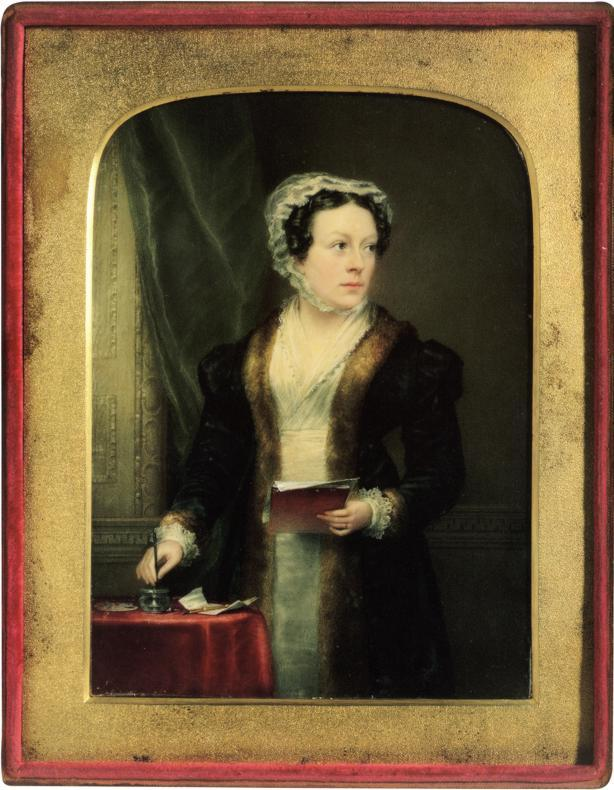
- Self-Portrait, c. 1822, watercolour on ivory, 18.1 by 13 cm, Victoria and Albert Museum, London
- Born: Christina Saunders; 17 December 1796; Kinghorn, Fife, Scotland
- Died: 30 April 1854 (aged 57); Saint Petersburg, Russia
- Known for: Portrait painting
- Spouse: James Robertson
- Relatives: George Sanders (uncle)

Christina Robertson RSA (née Saunders; 17 December 1796 – 30 April 1854) was a Scottish painter generally remembered for her portraits of Russian imperial family, representative of Academical tradition. She was the first woman honorary member of the Royal Scottish Academy.

== Life ==
Saunders was born in Kinghorn in Fife in December 1796, to parents who wished her to be educated. She was trained by her uncle, George Sa(u)nders, who painted miniatures and she launched into her career based at his house in London. Saunders was a successful portrait painter and she rapidly established a flow of commissions initially from Scottish patrons for her miniatures but later for oil and watercolour paintings, earning more than her mentor. By 1823 she was married to artist James Robertson but her art overshadowed his, and she was exhibiting at the Royal Academy and by 1828 she had her own studio, perhaps the first woman to do so. The following year she became the first honorary woman member of the Royal Scottish Academy.

During the 1830s, Robertson was travelling away from her family; although she gave birth to eight children, four of whom survived infancy. She worked in Paris in the mid 1830s and met members of the Russian Court, who could have already seen her work as engravings in magazines, and so she was tempted to join them in St Petersburg. There would have been more commissions than normal to replace the paintings lost in the fire that destroyed the Winter Palace in 1837. Saunders was in St Petersburg from 1839 to 1841 where she carried out full length painting of Tsar Nicholas I and Empress Alexandra and her three daughters - Maria, Olga and Alexandra. In 1841 she was the first, and only woman, to be made an honorary member, of the Imperial Academy of Arts.

She stayed in St Petersburg working as royal artist for ten years, although portraits of the imperial daughters-in-law were rejected in 1849. One of the sitters, Tsarevna Maria Alexandrovna later commissioned Robertson to paint her and her children, and the Empress chose her to paint an updated portrait of herself, in 1852.

Some of Roberston's portraits were engraved by 1833 and they were included in The portrait gallery of distinguished females including beauties of the courts of George IV and William IV with memoirs by John Burke.

During the Crimean War, Robertson fell from imperial favour; virtually obscure, she died in Saint Petersburg, and was interred into the Volkovo Cemetery.

== Legacy ==
Robertson left dozens of paintings that are important if only because they record the portraits of historic figures, but many were thought to have been destroyed by Bolsheviks in the Russian Revolution. She is thought to be less well known than she might have been, due to the deterioration of the relationship between the British and Russian empires.

== Gallery ==
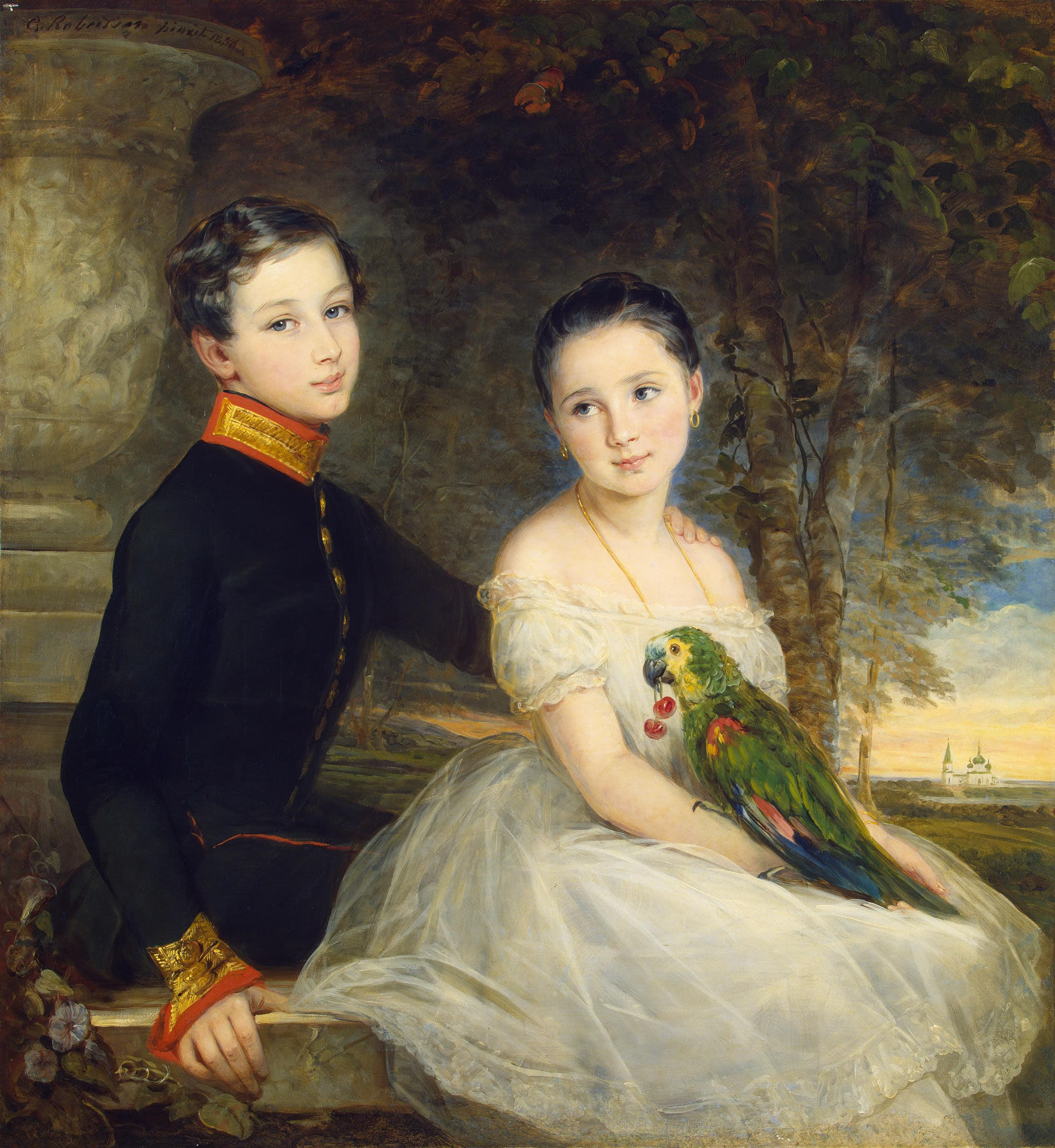
Children with Parrot, 1850

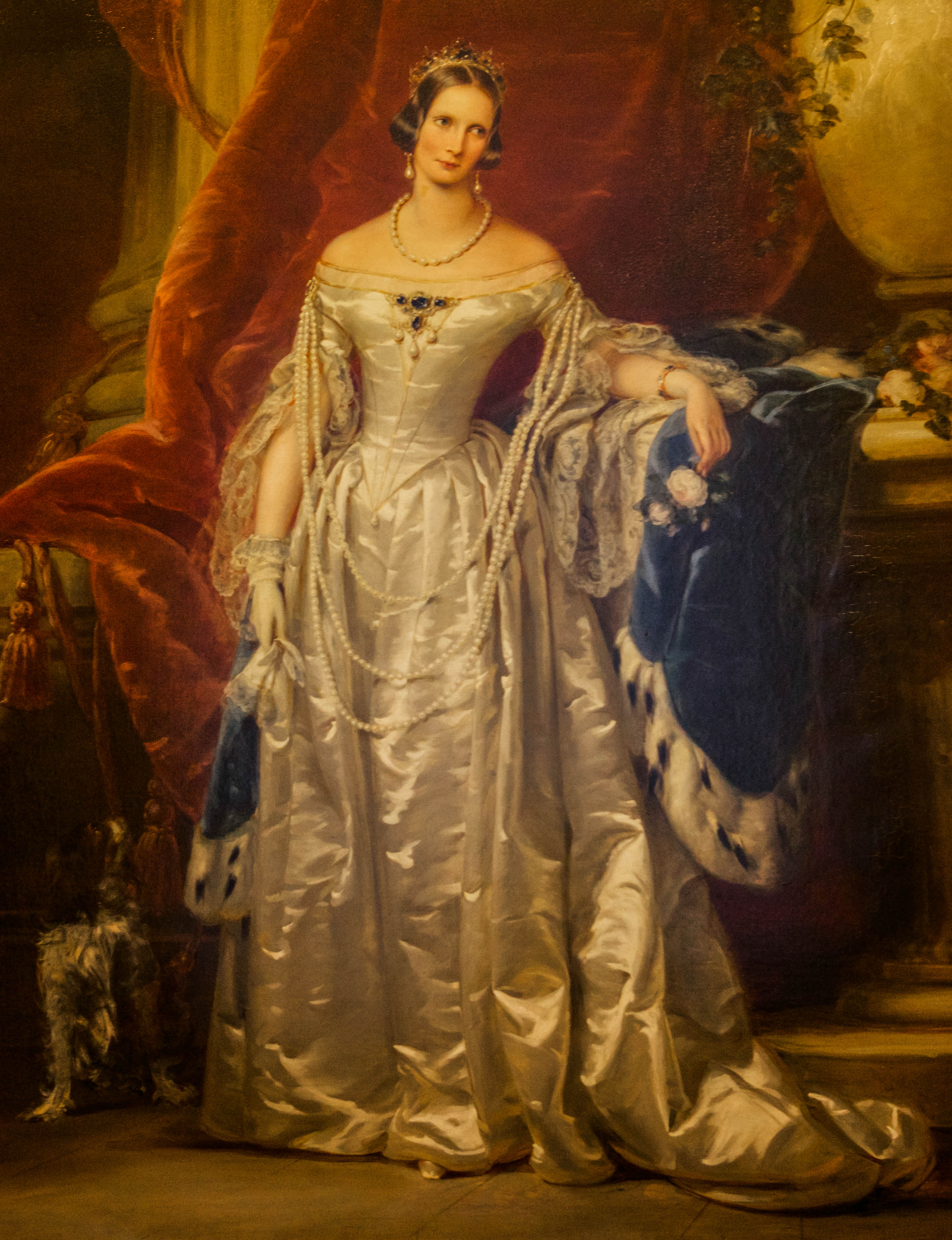
Empress Alexandra Feodorovna, 1840-41

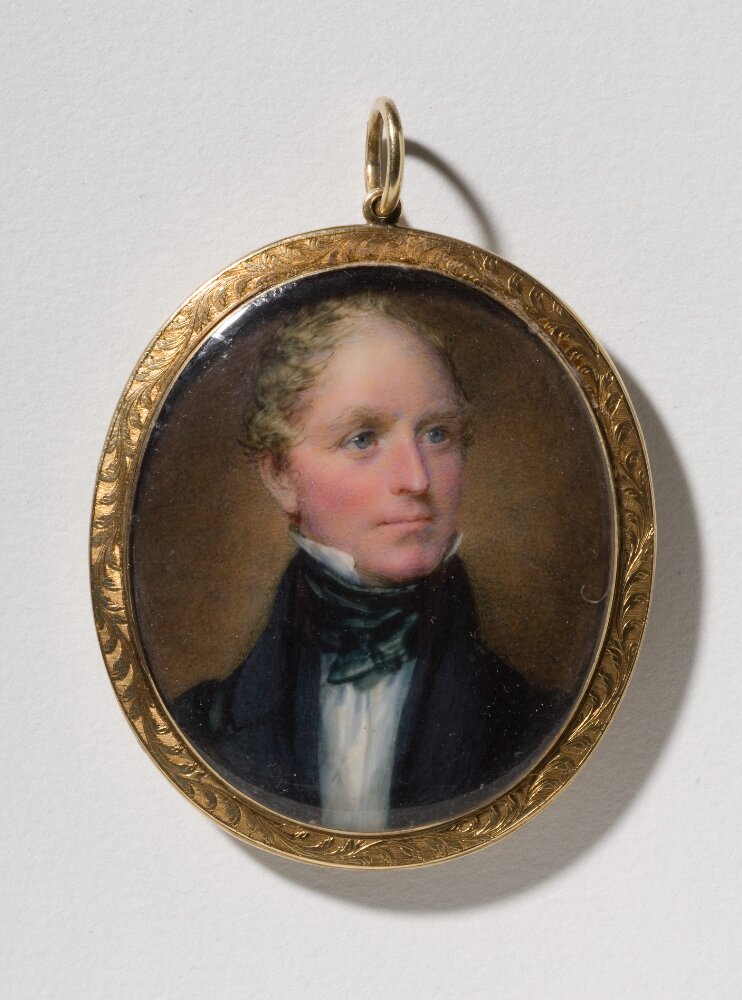
William Fraser, 1837

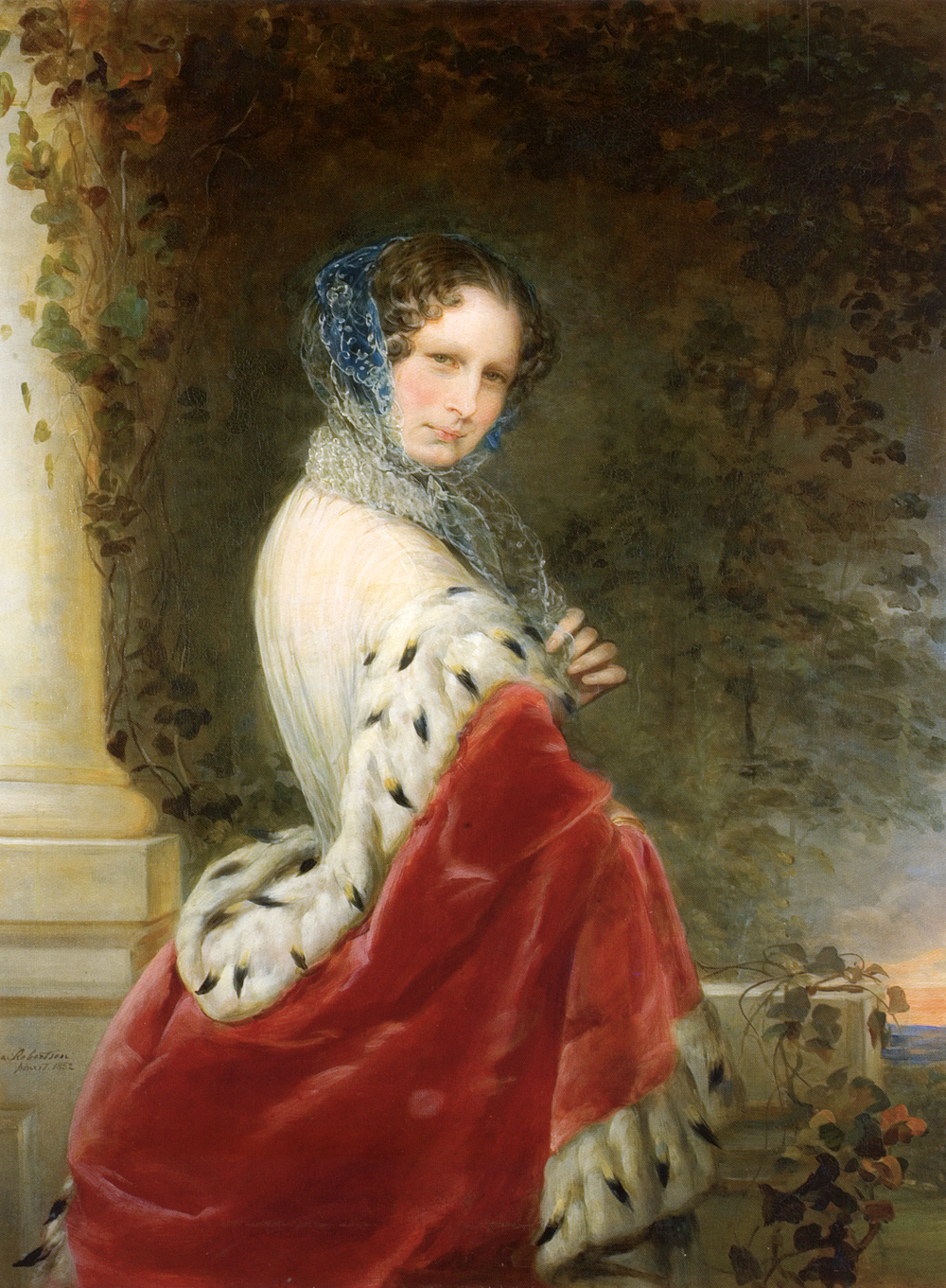
Portrait of Empress Alexandra Fyodorovna (Charlotte of Prussia), wife of Emperor Nicholas I, 1852
