= Pietro Gonzaga =

Italian painter

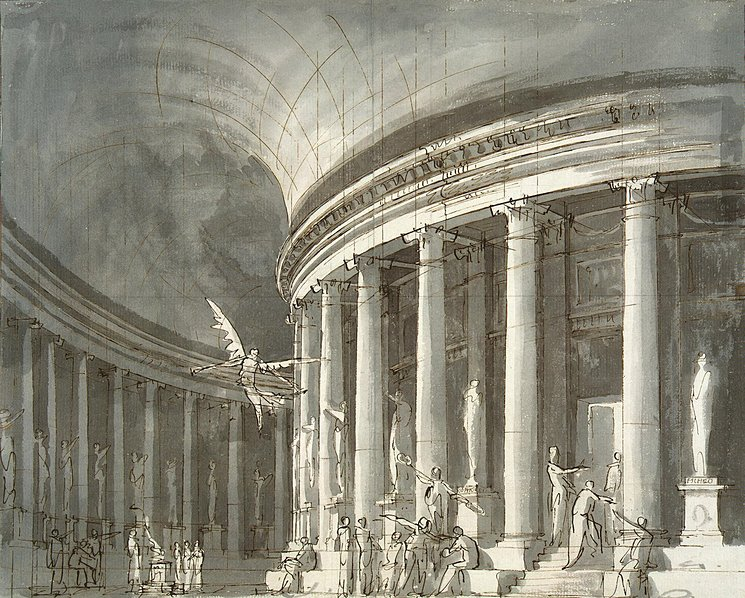
Stage design with Rotunda Temple, 1790s, Hermitage Museum

Pietro di Gottardo Gonzaga (contemporary French: Pierre Gothard Gonzague; Russian: Пьетро Гонзага; 25 March 1751 – 6 August [O.S. 25 July] 1831) was an Italian theatre set designer who worked in Italy and, since 1792, in the Russian Empire.

A vedutist, master of chiaroscuro art and trompe-l'œil optical illusions, Gonzaga was primarily known for his fantastic yet deceptively realistic stage sets, and summarized the theory and purpose of his art as "music for the eyes" (French: la musique des yeux): "a perspective that changes in relation to variations in musical expression." According to Ferrero, Gonzaga was the first to promote scenic design into an art "in its own right" and shake off the derided image of mere decoration devoid of art. With age he lost confidence in his profession and aspired, in vain, to become a practicing architect.

== Career in Italy ==
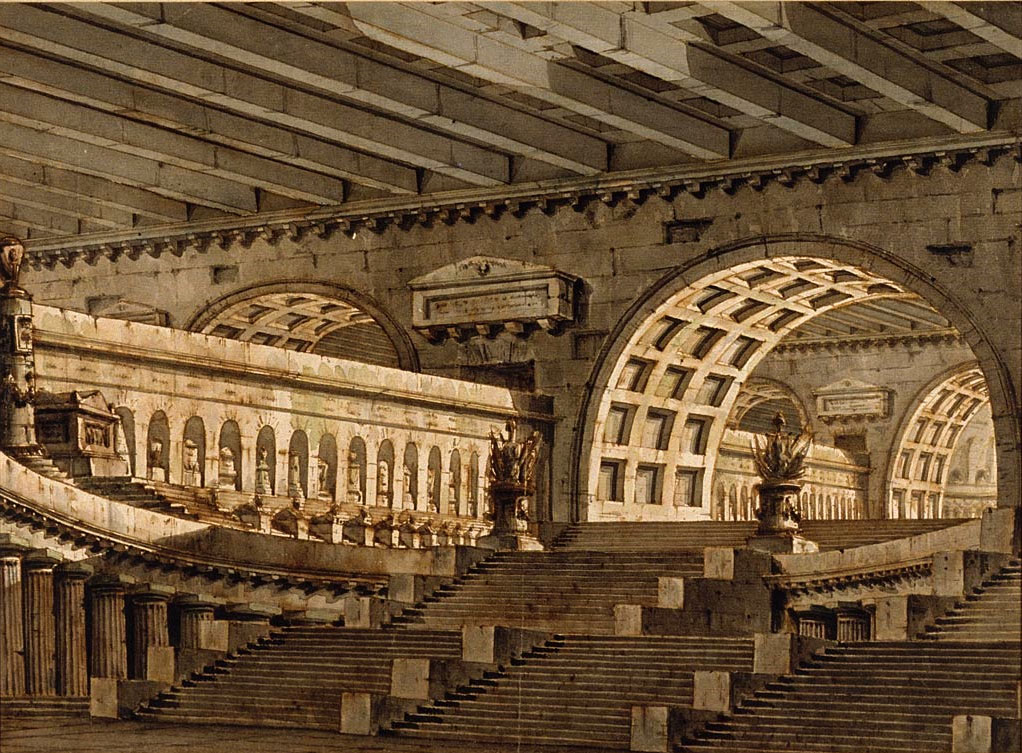
Subterranean Mausoleum, 1780s, Art Institute of Chicago

Gonzaga was born in Longarone, Italy. He trained in Venice from 1769 to 1772 under Giuseppe Moretti and Antonio Visentini. He was influenced by the art of Canaletto, Bibiena, Tiepolo but most of all Piranesi. In 1772 he joined the art firm of the Galliari family.

In 1779 Gonzaga debuted as solo stage designer in Teatro alla Scala production of ballets by Giuseppe Canziani and Sebastiano Gallet, and stayed with this theatre until the 1792 season. Subsequently, he produced over sixty sets in Milan, Genoa, Rome and Venice. His curtain for the La Fenice theatre became a standard copied by numerous imitators.

Gonzaga's Italian works, along with Galliari family legacy, were published in Milan in three installments between 1803 and 1821.

Gonzaga's life changed after meeting prince Nikolay Yusupov, personal envoy of Catherine II of Russia to Italian states, who was based in Turin during 1784–1789. Yusupov returned to Saint Petersburg in 1791 to accept the role of managing entertainment of the imperial court, which placed him at the helm of state theatre companies. It is not known reliably whether Gonzaga was invited to Russia by Yusupov or by Giacomo Quarenghi, but in 1792 Yusupov, representing the state, and Gonzaga signed a hire contract that made the latter chief decorator (stage designer) for all performances of the Saint Petersburg state theatre, with an unusually generous pay provision. Yusupov remained Gonzaga's patron until their deaths in 1831.

Gonzaga's line of scenic design at La Scala was continued by his trainee Paolo Landriani.

== Career in Russia ==
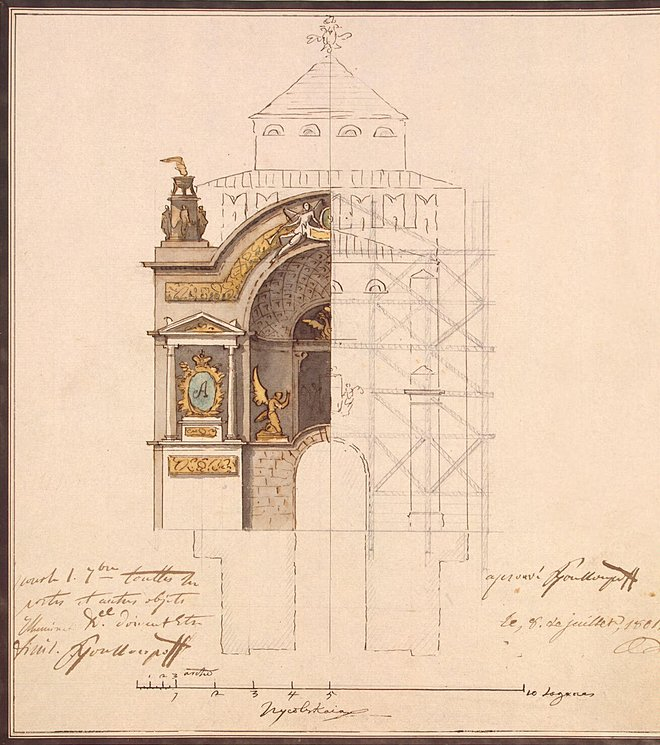
Decoration of the Nikolskaya tower of Moscow Kremlin for the coronation of Alexander I, 1801, Hermitage Museum

Gonzaga surprised Saint Petersburg audience by novel use of optical illusions and bold chiaroscuro that supported them (dim, diffused light of oil lamps of the period washed out subtle tones and called for radical, contrasting blacks and whites). According to Alexander Benois, "he painted right on the floor, not like in easel painting, but simply sketching with a thick brush, spreading paint with his foot, and this foot painting under artificial lighting completely enchanted [the witnesses]." Contrary to recommendation of Alexander Cozens, he sketched his drafts in lampblack, not black ink.

Gonzaga dominated the art department of imperial theatres for over thirty years, surviving three monarchs: Catherine II, Paul I and Alexander I. He decorated coronations of Paul (1797), Alexander I (1801) and Nicholas I (1826) while his lifelong benefactor Yusupov administered all three events. Gonzaga became a trusted consultant to heiress and later empress Maria Fyodorovna, Golitsyn and Yusupov families and diversified into decorating palace interiors and landscape design. Fyodor Glinka described Gonzaga's three-dimensional trompe-l'œil folly in Pavlovsk Park (1815): "What is a reality and what is a dream? ... Convinced at the existence of what was before me, I kept going further and further forward. But suddenly something strange began to happen to my eyes: it was as if an invisible curtain of some sort was descending upon these objects and swallowing them from sight ... At length I began to quarrel with my own eyes and my head began to spin, and I hastened to be gone from this realms of charms and magic!"

Gonzaga summarized his experience and theory of theatrical presentation and illusion in a series of books printed in Saint Petersburg in French language, notably the 1807 Information a mon chef and 1800 La musique des yeux et l'optique theatrale (English: Music for the Eyes). Gonzaga claimed that optical illusions are not abstract theories but correspond to "things that are easily perceived when one looks with a certain degree of attention", thus the stage set should be designed as a "perceived reality to be grasped with attention in all changing aspects".

As he grew older, Gonzaga gradually became more and more dissatisfied with the work of producing ephemeral follies that rarely lasted longer than a single theatrical season. He suffered depression, feeling that his life was spent in vain, and begged his patrons to offer him a chance to prove himself in architecture and leave a tangible trace of his talent. He applied to all available vacancies and architectural contests, and was always rejected. By 1827, when Emperor Nicholas awarded him an honorary title of court architect, Gonzaga was already too old for practical construction. Nestor Kukolnik suggested that earlier, in the 1810s, Gonzaga designed and built Yusupov's private theatre in Arkhangelskoye Estate, but his attribution was later discarded.

He died in Saint Petersburg, Russia, in 1831.

== Works ==
Graphic works by Gonzaga are preserved in the Hermitage Museum, the National Gallery of Art and the Art Institute of Chicago

Arkhangelskoye Estate museum stocks the original stage curtain painted by Gonzaga and four complete original stage backdrops out of sixteen he produced for Yusupov's private theatre. The museum intends to make life-sized copies for public display, as the originals are too fragile. Elektronny Arhiv, a Russian company that digitized this artwork, claimed to have built the world's largest scanner specifically for this job

Designs based on drawings by Gonzaga and Angelo Toselli were used to decorate the concrete walls of the private Museum for Architectural Drawing in Berlin (architects Sergei Tchoban and Sergey Kuznetsov, 2013).

== Sources ==
- Ferrero, Mercedes Vialle (2002). Stage and set, in:

Bianconi, Lorenzo; et al. (2002). Opera on stage. University of Chicago Press. ISBN 9780226045917.

- Kirk, Terry (2005). The architecture of modern Italy. Princeton Architectural Press. ISBN 9781568984209.
- Korndorf, Anna. "Fortuna illuzionista (Фортуна иллюзиониста. Пьетро Гонзага - художник юсуповского театра" (in Russian). Kultura Portal. Archived from the original on 2010-11-26.
- Newlin, Thomas (2001). The voice in the garden: Andrei Bolotov and the anxieties of Russian pastoral, 1738-1833. Northwestern University Press. ISBN 9780810116139.
- Romani, Luigi (1861). Teatro alla Scala: cronologia di tutti gli spettacoli (in Italian). Luigi di Giacomo Pirola, Milan.
