= Angelo Toselli =

Italian painter

- Born: с.1765 Bologna
- Died: 1826/27
- Notable work: Panorama of Saint Petersburg, 1817-1820

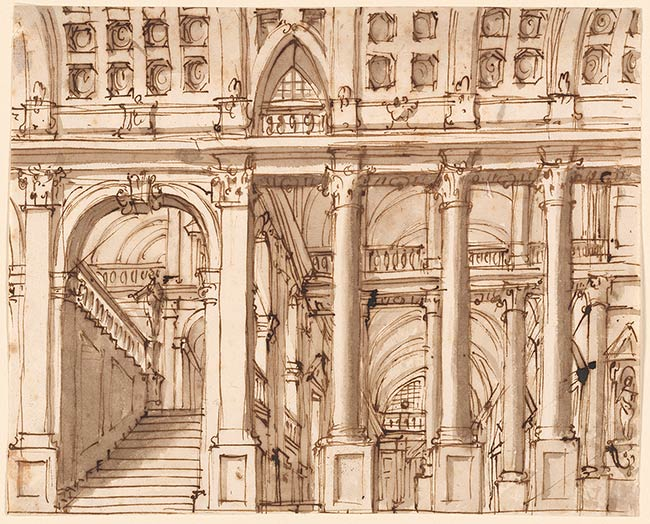
A palace hallway with a grand staircase at left, held by the Morgan Library & Museum

Angelo Toselli (c. 1765, in Bologna – 1827?), Italian artist, architect, scenographer, and vedutista.

In 1816, presumably in Rome, he was teaching the art of perspective to Orest Kiprensky who just arrived into Italy at the time. Kiprensky in his letters to Russia asked to take care of his mentor as he is a good human being.

While in Rome, Toselli created a stage designs for The Barber of Seville by Gioachino Rossini premiered under the title Almaviva, o sia L'inutile precauzione at the Teatro Argentina 20 February 1816.

In 1816, Toselli was invited by the administration of the Imperial Theatres to come to Saint Petersburg. He arrived to Russian capital in 1816 or 1817. Worked mostly at the Bolshoi Theatre, creating (alongside with artists Canoppi and Kondratiev) decorations for the ballet productions by Charles Didelot, including A Hunting Adventure (1818), Laura and Henry or The Troubadour (1819, new scenery for the last act), Ken-si and Tao or Beauty and the Beast (1819).

In 1817–1820, he created his most famous work, Panorama of Saint Petersburg as seen from Kunstkamera tower (watercolor, gouache, 0,51 х 6,56 m., collection of the Hermitage Museum). Intended to be shown as a single unit, later it was cut into six separate sheets. In 1991, Khudozhnik RSFSR published an album with reproductions of this work.

His another panoramic painting Scenography of Jerusalem and the surrounding holy places was demonstrated in an enfilade of Lobanov-Rostovsky Palace, new-built commercial residence on Saint Isaac's Square with an entrance fee of 5 roubles. Pavel Svinyin witnessed that ″This spectacle is very much like a theatrical stage, but incomparably more lively″. To achieve that Toselly used staffage and some other tricks : thus, the image of the Pool of Siloam was accompanied by sounds of water.

Drawings by Angelo Toselli along with drawings by Pietro Gonzaga were used for decoration the concrete walls of the private Museum for Architectural Drawing in Berlin (arch. Sergei Tchoban and Sergey Kuznetsov, 2013).

== Links ==
- Drawings by Angelo Toselli // Cooper Hewitt, Smithsonian Design Museum
