= Museum for Architectural Drawing =

Private museum in Berlin, Germany

Coordinates: 52°31′56″N 13°24′36″E

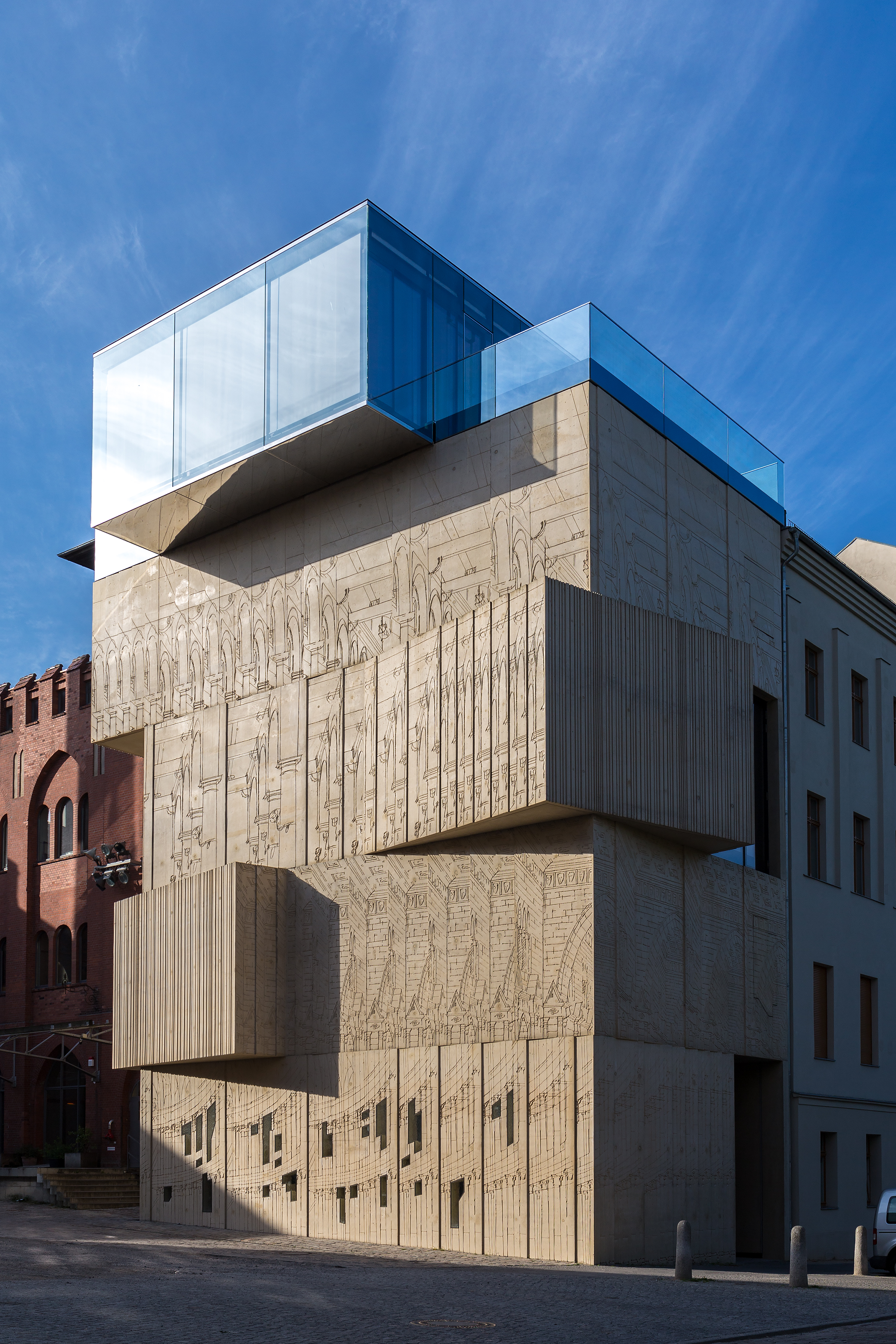
The museum as seen from Christinenstrasse

Museum for Architectural Drawing, Berlin

The Museum for Architectural Drawing (German: Museum für Architekturzeichnung) is a private museum in Berlin, Germany run by the Tchoban Foundation. It was opened in June 2013. Three to four exhibitions are shown each year, made up of drawings from the Tchoban Foundation’s collection and from works on loan in cooperation with other museums and institutions.

== Organising body ==
The Tchoban Foundation, a private trust based in Berlin, runs the museum to promote architectural drawing by hand. It was founded by the architect Sergei Tchoban in 2009. Its aim is to foster the drawing skills of talented young architects and to make the founder’s collection accessible for study. Exhibitions of drawings are presented on site as well as in other museums worldwide. Together with the founder, Dr. Eva-Maria Barkhofen and Dr. Christian Benedik form the curatorship.

== Collection ==
Sergei Tchoban’s collection began with the purchase of a drawing by Pietro di Gottardo Gonzaga. Since then it has grown to consist of more than one hundred sheets dating from different periods from the 16th century to today. The trust meanwhile owns more than one hundred drawings by international architects from the 20th and 21st century as well as works by Tchoban himself.

== Building ==
Designed by the Moscow office SPEECH Tchoban & Kuznetsov, the Museum for Architectural Drawing, completed in 2013, is a four-storey solid corpus with a glass floor stacked on top. The profile of the four floors is reminiscent of casually piled up blocks. Its closed surface is detailed with strong magnified fragments of architectonic sketches in relief form. The line drawings (original drawings by Pietro Gonzaga and Angelo Toselli were used) and the colour of the cast concrete refer to the purpose of the building as a place for exhibiting architectural drawings. The museum shop and library are on the ground floor. Cabinets have been created on the first and second floor for temporary exhibitions. The museum depository is on the third floor. Windows have been avoided on these three floors to provide optimal conditions for the conservation of drawings. The Trust’s office is situated on the glazed top floor. 200 of the 450 available square metres, including the ticket desk and library, are used for exhibition space.

== Exhibitions (selection) ==
- Architectural Worlds. Sergei Tchoban – Draftsman and Collector. DAM German Architecture Museum, Frankfurt am Main. 2010
- The Golden Age of Architectural Graphics. Drawings of European Masters from the Collection of the Architect Sergei Tchoban. The Pushkin State Museum of Fine Arts, Moscow. 2010
- Piranesi’s Paestum. Master Drawings Uncovered. An Exhibition from the collection of the Sir John Soane's Museum, London in the Museum for Architectural Drawing, Berlin, 2013
- Architecture in Cultural Strife. Russian and Soviet Architecture in Drawings. 1900–1953. Museum for Architectural Drawing, Berlin. 2013–2014
- Lebbeus Woods. ON-LINE. Museum for Architectural Drawing, Berlin. 2014
- LʼHôtel Particulier à Paris. An Exhibition from the collection of the École nationale supérieure des beaux-arts de Paris in the Museum for Architectural Drawing, Berlin. 2014–15
- Alexander Brodsky – Works. Museum for Architectural Drawing, Berlin. 2015
- Architectural Master Drawings from the Albertina. An Exhibition from the collection of the Albertina, Vienna in the Museum for Architectural Drawing, Berlin. 2016
- Anime Architecture. Museum for Architectural Drawing, Berlin. 2016
- Peter Cook. Retrospective. Museum for Architectural Drawing, Berlin. 2016–15
- Hans Poelzig. Projects for Berlin. Exhibition from the collection of the Architekturmuseum der Technischen Universität Berlin in the Museum for Architectural Drawing, Berlin. 2018
- SIZA – Unseen & Unknown. Museum for Architectural Drawing, Berlin. 2019
- Thom Mayne: SculpturalDrawings. Museum for Architectural Drawing, Berlin. 2020
- James Wines and SITE: Retrospective 1970–2020. Museum for Architectural Drawing, Berlin. 2020
- Mark Fisher: Drawing Entertainment. Museum for Architectural Drawing, Berlin. 2021
- Stalin’s Architect: The Rise and Fall of Boris Iofan. Museum for Architectural Drawing, Berlin. 2022
- AKIRA – The Architecture of Neo Tokyo. Museum for Architectural Drawing, Berlin. 2022
- Aldo Rossi. Insulae. Museum for Architectural Drawing, Berlin. 2023
- ArchiVision. 10th Anniversary of the Museum for Architectural Drawing. Museum for Architectural Drawing, Berlin. 2023
- Alvar Aalto in Germany: Drawing Modernism. Museum for Architectural Drawing, Berlin. 2023
- Lina Bo Bardi – The Poetry of Concrete. Museum for Architectural Drawing, Berlin. 2024
- Steven Holl – Drawing as Thought. Museum for Architectural Drawing, Berlin. 2025
- Plans and Dreams – Drawn in the GDR. Museum for Architectural Drawing, Berlin. 2025
- Otto Wagner – Architect of Modern Life. Museum for Architectural Drawing, Berlin. 2025
