= Mark Fisher (architect) =

British architect

- Born: 20 April 1947; Warwickshire, England
- Died: 25 June 2013 (aged 66); Hampstead, England
- Education: Architectural Association School of Architecture
- Occupation: Architect
- Practice: Stufish
- Buildings: U2 360° 'The Claw'
- Projects: Pink Floyd 'The Wall'; The Rolling Stones 'Steel Wheels'; Madonna 'MDNA Tour'; Beijing 2008 Olympic Opening Ceremony; Elton John "Million Dollar Piano"

Mark Fisher, OBE, MVO, RDI (20 April 1947 – 25 June 2013) was a British architect best known for his rock music stage sets. He was born in Warwickshire, England.

Fisher graduated from the Architectural Association School of Architecture (AA School) in London in 1971. He was a Unit Master at the AA School from 1973 to 1977. In 1984 he set up the Fisher Park Partnership with Jonathan Park. The partnership was dissolved in 1994 when he established Stufish, the Mark Fisher Studio.

== Stage sets ==
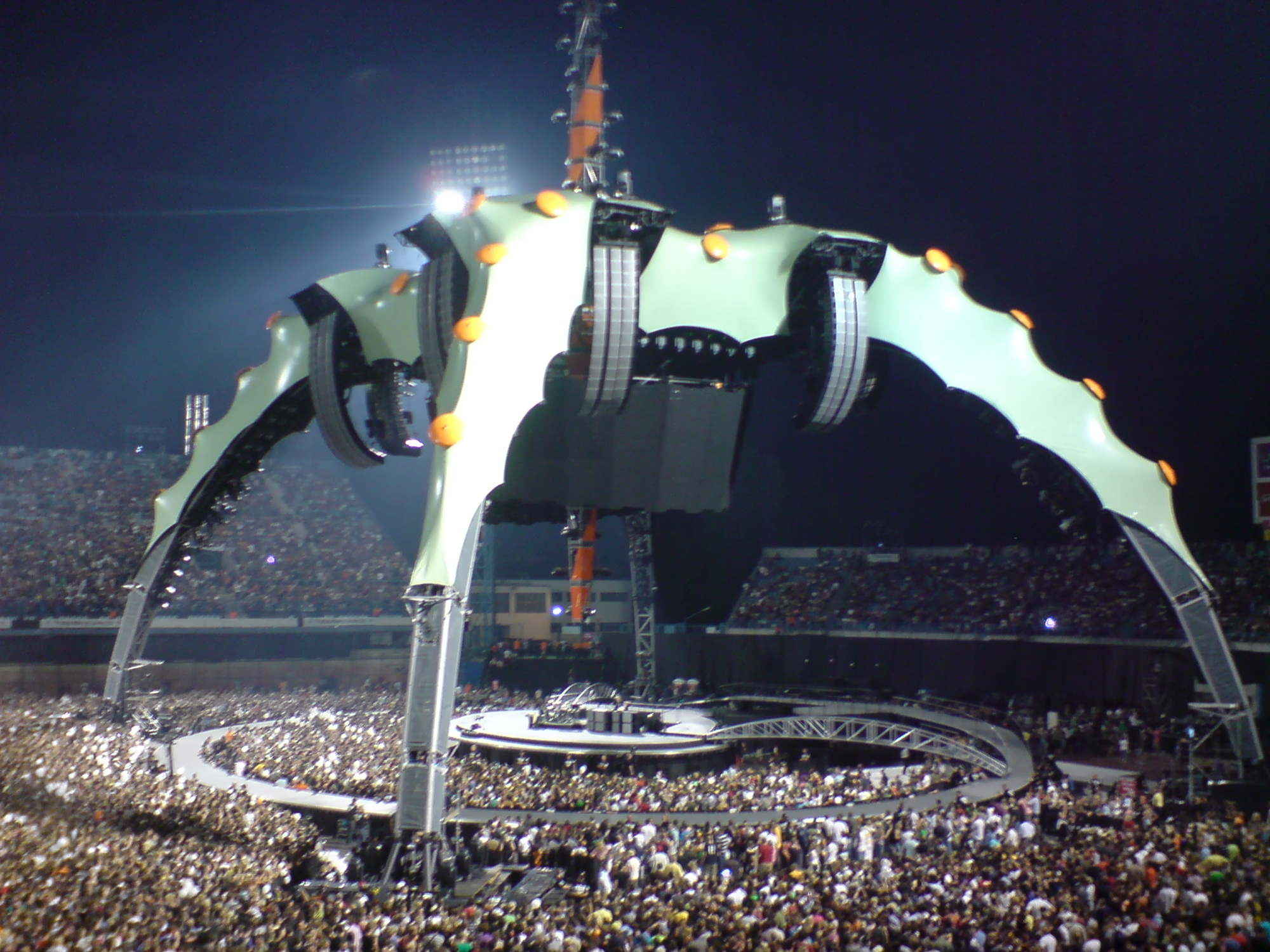
Mark Fisher was architect for numerous rock music stages including the famous U2 "Claw" (2009)

Fisher designed stage sets for Pink Floyd (including 'In the Flesh Tour' performed live in 1977, ‘The Wall Tour’ performed live 1980–81 (with Roger Waters and Gerald Scarfe) and 'The Division Bell Tour' 1994), for The Rolling Stones (including Steel Wheels/Urban Jungle Tour 1989, Voodoo Lounge Tour 1994, Bridges to Babylon Tour 1997, A Bigger Bang Tour 2005, and 50 & Counting... Tour 2012), Mylène Farmer (Avant que l'ombre... à Bercy in 2006, 2009 Tour and Timeless in 2013), Tina Turner and U2 (including the Zoo TV Tour in 1992, PopMart Tour 1997 and the U2 360° Tour in 2009), and for the 2012 Diamond Jubilee Concert, Madonna's 2012 The MDNA Tour, Lady Gaga's 2012 Born This Way Ball and for the Metallica's World Magnetic Tour. In 2000, he created the Millennium Dome Show with Peter Gabriel. He has designed opening and closing ceremonies for the Olympics (Torino 2006 and Beijing 2008), The Genesis' Turn It On Again: The Tour, The Million Dollar Piano for Elton John and the 2010 Asian Games, and stage sets for theatrical shows including We Will Rock You and both KÀ and Viva Elvis by Cirque du Soleil in Las Vegas. He designed the stage sets for Laura Pausini's Inedito World Tour.

Fisher designed the Han Show theatre in 2010. Fisher and his team worked closely with the client, designing a viable building alongside their vision of innovative technology and exhilarating spectacle.

Fisher died in his sleep on 25 June 2013 at the Marie Curie Hospice in Hampstead, UK, leaving an estate, before taxes, of more than £7 million. His design for Elton John's Diving Board Tour debuted posthumously.

== Exhibitions ==
- 2021: Mark Fisher: Drawing Entertainment. Museum for Architectural Drawing, Berlin
