= Sergey Kuznetsov (architect) =

Russian architect

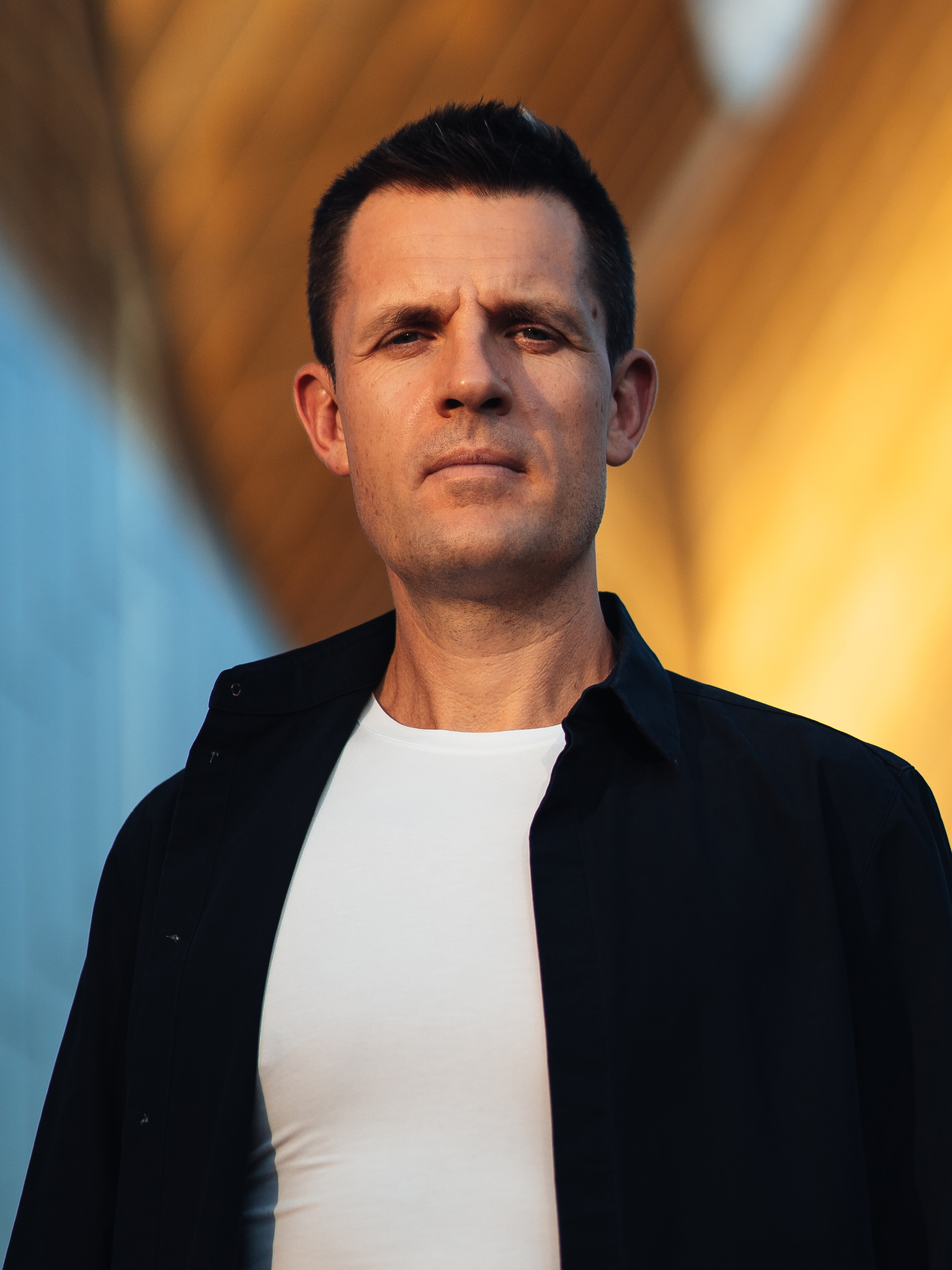
- Born: 25 July 1977 (age 49); Moscow, RSFSR
- Education: Moscow Architectural Institute
- Occupation: Architect
- Awards: Medal of the Order "For Merit to the Fatherland"
- Projects: Irina Viner-Usmanova's Gymnastics Palace, Zaryadye Park, reconstruction of the Luzhniki Stadium, Tolmachevo Airport terminal, Krasnodar Stadium, Russian Pavilion at Expo 2015, urban planning concept of the Microcity "In the Forest", Museum of Architectural Drawing in Berlin, Palace of Water Sports in Kazan

Sergey Olegovich Kuznetsov (Russian: Серге́й Оле́гович Кузнецо́в; born 25 July 1977, Moscow) is a Russian architect, Former Chief Architect of Moscow (from 21 August 2012 to 3 April 2026).

== Biography ==
Sergey Kuznetsov was born in Moscow, Russia in 1977. He attended secondary school № 329 and then studied at Moscow Architectural Institute, Department of Residential and Public Buildings, where he got a Diploma in Architecture in 2001.

In 2000, he became partner and general director of architectural studio “SLK-Proekt”. In 2003, he became partner and general director of architectural studio “S.P.Proekt”. From 2006 to 2012 he was the managing partner of the architectural association «SPEECH Tchoban & Kuznetsov” in Moscow. In 2008, he co-founded the architectural magazine speech:, together with Sergei Tchoban.

In 2010, he participated in the project “Russia Factory” for the exhibition of the Russian pavilion at the 12th Venice Architecture Biennale. In 2012, he was co-curator of the exhibition i-city/i-land Skolkovo project of the Russian pavilion at the 13th Venice Architecture Biennale. The pavilion was awarded a Special Mention. In 2012, he was appointed Chief Architect of Moscow – First Deputy Chairman of Committee for Architecture and Urban Planning of Moscow. In 2013, he was appointed Chairman of the Architectural Council of Moscow. In 2014, he was appointed Chairman of the Town Planning Board of the Skolkovo Foundation. In 2014, he became an Honorary Professor of Moscow Architectural Institute (MARCHI).

== Work as the Chief Architect of Moscow ==
By decree of the Mayor of Moscow № 681-RM on 20 August 2012 Sergey Kuznetsov was appointed as the Chief Architect of Moscow, the First Deputy Chairman of the Committee for Architecture and Urban Planning of Moscow.

During Kuznetsov’s first year in office, over 20 competitions in urban planning projects were held, including several major international competitions that included the design of Zaryadye Park and the National Centre for Contemporary Arts (NCCA). Working closely with Moscow Mayor Sobyanin and the Moscow Government, on the initiative of Sergey Kuznetsov competitions have become regular practice in Moscow as an effective method of urban planning.

Kuznetsov is also the Chairman of the Architectural Council of Moscow – a standing collegial consultative body to the Moscow City Committee for Architecture and Urban Planning. The Council’s work is aimed at making the decisions on key urban projects widely open to the public.

== Quotes ==
- “It’s not the architects that create cities and architecture; it’s the citizens, irrespective of the government model.”
- “Moscow has a great potential. It is a rich and successful city. And it’s our job to channel this energy positively.”
- “Moscow must become a city in the full sense of the word. A city is a lifestyle. You live in a house that should be different from other houses: Your house should have a pleasant yard; your street should provide opportunities to go to a café, a restaurant, a corner store, or to socialize in any other way.”
- “It is impossible for us to become a warmer city, but we can become more attractive and hospitable.”
- “A chance to hold a competition and realize a project at a site as important for Moscow as Zaryadye is a once in a lifetime opportunity. I am happy because of the firm attitude of Moscow Mayor Sergey Sobyanin international competitions are becoming a common practice for Moscow, and through them we choose really great projects that when realized could achieve the world-best level. This is the only way for Moscow to join the ranks of world architecture capitals. Quote about the city for the people, public spaces, etc.”

== Selected projects ==
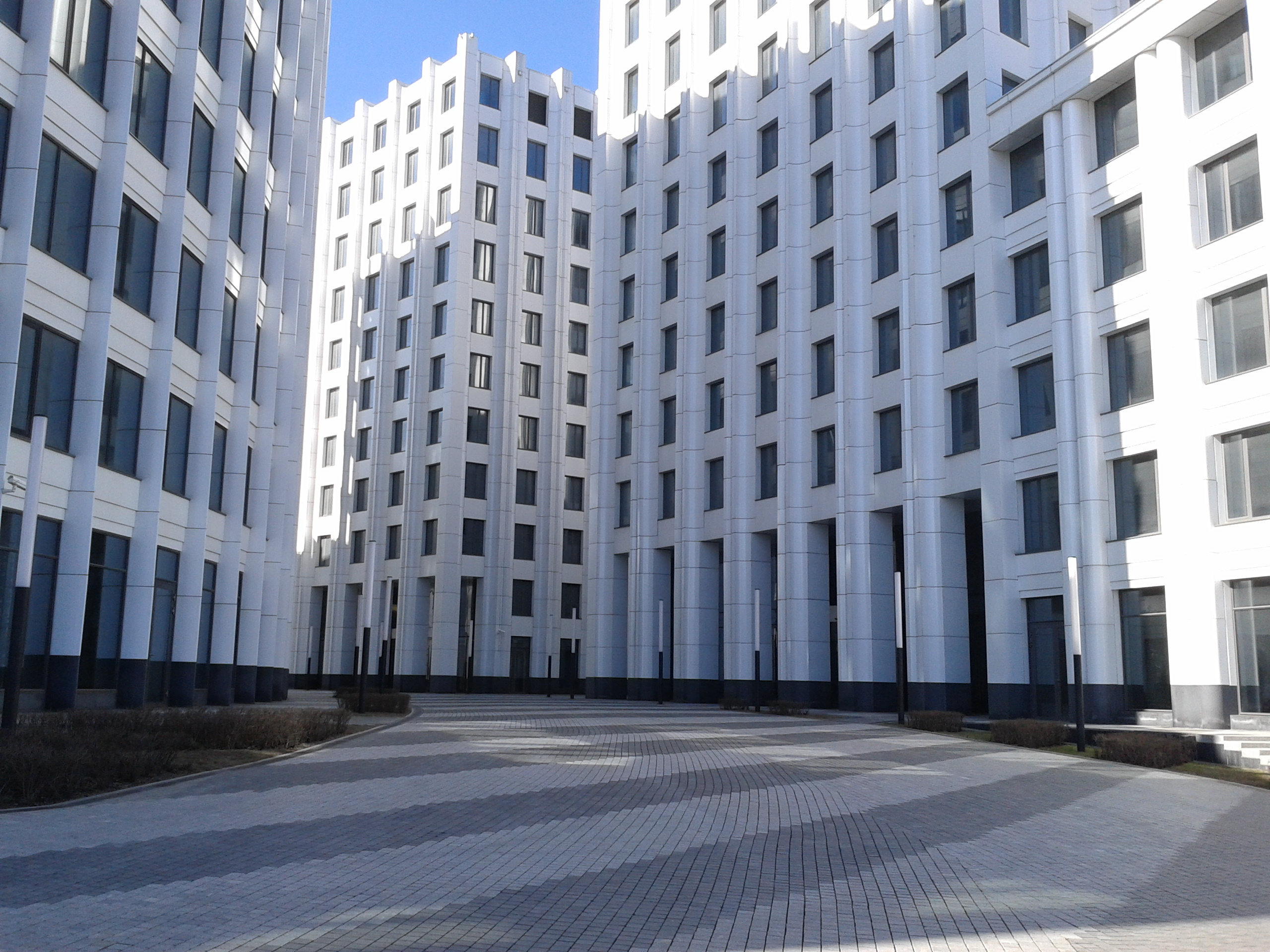
Architecture by Sergey Kuznetsov (Ozerkovskaya embankment, 24)

- Granatniy 6 residential complex, Moscow, Russia, 2007-2010
- Office Building on Leninsky, Moscow, Russia, 2007-2011
- Palace of Water Sports, Kazan, Russia, 2008-2012
- Aquamarine III Business Centre. Moscow
- Museum for Architectural Drawing, Berlin, Germany, 2009-2013
- Housing estate “V lesu” on Pyatnitskoye highway, Moscow, 2008 - up to present time
- Complex of buildings for media accommodation during 2014 Olympics, Sochi, Russia, 2010-2012
- Zaryadye information pavilion, Moscow, Russia, 2014

== Exhibitions ==
- 2006 — ARCH Moscow in Moscow, Russia
- 2008 — MIPIM in Cannes, France
- 2010 — “Factory Russia” at the XII Architectural Biennale in Venice, Italy
- 2012 — The Architect’s Eye in Milan, Italy
- 2012 — i-city/i-land in Venice, Italy
- 2013 — Golden River at Cortile d’Onore in Italy
- 2014 — “New Moscow – Новая Москва” at Aedes Gallery in Berlin, Germany
- 2014 — U_cloud in Milan, France
- 2014 — MOSKVA: urban space. Collateral Event of the 14th International Architecture Exhibition – la Biennale di Venezia
- 2014 — All About Italy! Architectural Graphics of the XVIII — XXI Centuries at Tretyakov Gallery in Moscow, Russia

Political offices
Preceded by Aleksandr Kuzmin	Chief Architect of Moscow; 2012-present	Succeeded by Incumbent
