= Arkhangelskoye Palace =

Historical estate in Krasnogorsky District, Moscow Oblast, Russia

Coordinates: 55°47′15″N 37°17′4″E

- Арха́нгельское
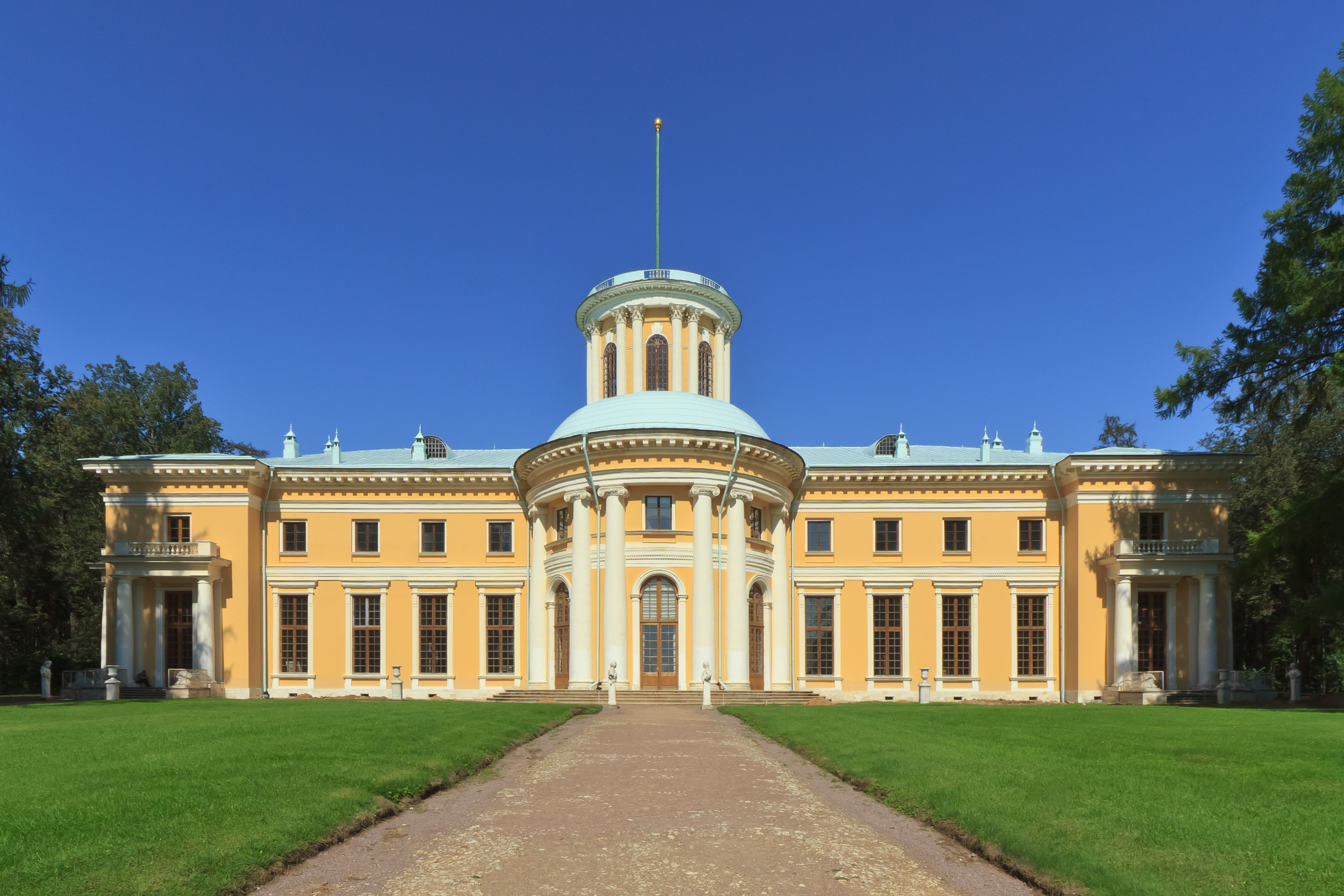
- Arkhangelskoye estate. The palace, 21st century

Arkhangelskoye (Russian: Арха́нгельское) is a historical estate in Krasnogorsky District, Moscow Oblast, Russia, located around 20 km to the west of Moscow and 2 km southwest of Krasnogorsk.

== History ==
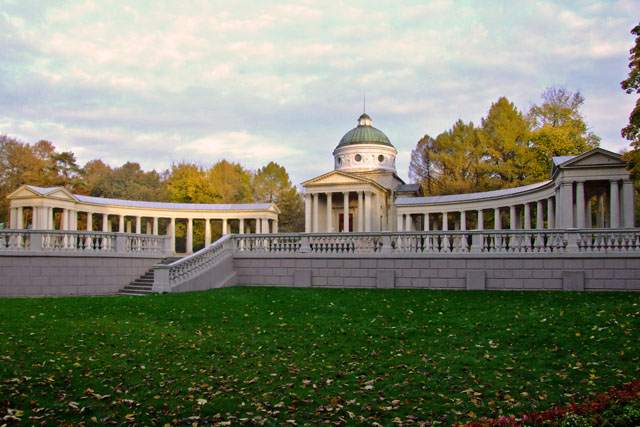
The unfinished "Colonnade" mausoleum

From 1703 to 1810, Arkhangelskoye belonged to the Golitsyns. In 1810, Prince Nikolai Yusupov bought the estate, which stayed in the Yusupov family until the Russian Revolution. In 1917, the Yusupovs' property was nationalized by the Bolsheviks. Today, Arkhangelskoye is a state museum.

The estate is built in a neoclassical style by Jacob Guerne, with the prominent palace facing the Moscow river and a regular terraced park decorated with many antique statues. Other structures of note include a small palace named the Caprice, monuments to Catherine the Great and Alexander Pushkin and an 18th-century theatre designed by famous Italian theater set designer Pietro Gonzaga (1751–1831). Arkhangelskoye's oldest building is the church of Archangel Michael (1646). Among the other buildings are Saint Gates (1825–26), the uncompleted "Colonnade" («Колоннада»; constructed from 1909 to 1916), which was intended to be a mausoleum for Nicholas Yusupov, the elder son of Zinaida Yusupova, and now as an exhibition hall, and two extensions of the sanatorium built in the 1930s.

The estate is famous for its collection of fine art including paintings, sculptures, furniture, ceramics and interior.

== Arkhangelskoye today ==
In 1996, the Russian Ministry of Culture acquired the estate, but did not find itself in a position to maintain it. For this reason, the site was listed in the 1996 World Monuments Watch by the World Monuments Fund. According to the organization, exterior columns and plaster were damaged, and the theater's roof and main staircase were unsound. When the site was listed again on the 2002 World Monuments Watch, Moscow officials had drafted a thorough conservation plan, which included work on the exterior of the building and the surrounding gardens. Help for interior conservation came from American Express through the World Monuments Fund. During this project, paintings by Hubert Robert were conserved and other repairs took place. Nowadays Arkhangelskoye is a popular tourist attraction, and is often visited by Muscovites on short trips. Important cultural events take place at the estate, such as music festivals.

== Image gallery ==
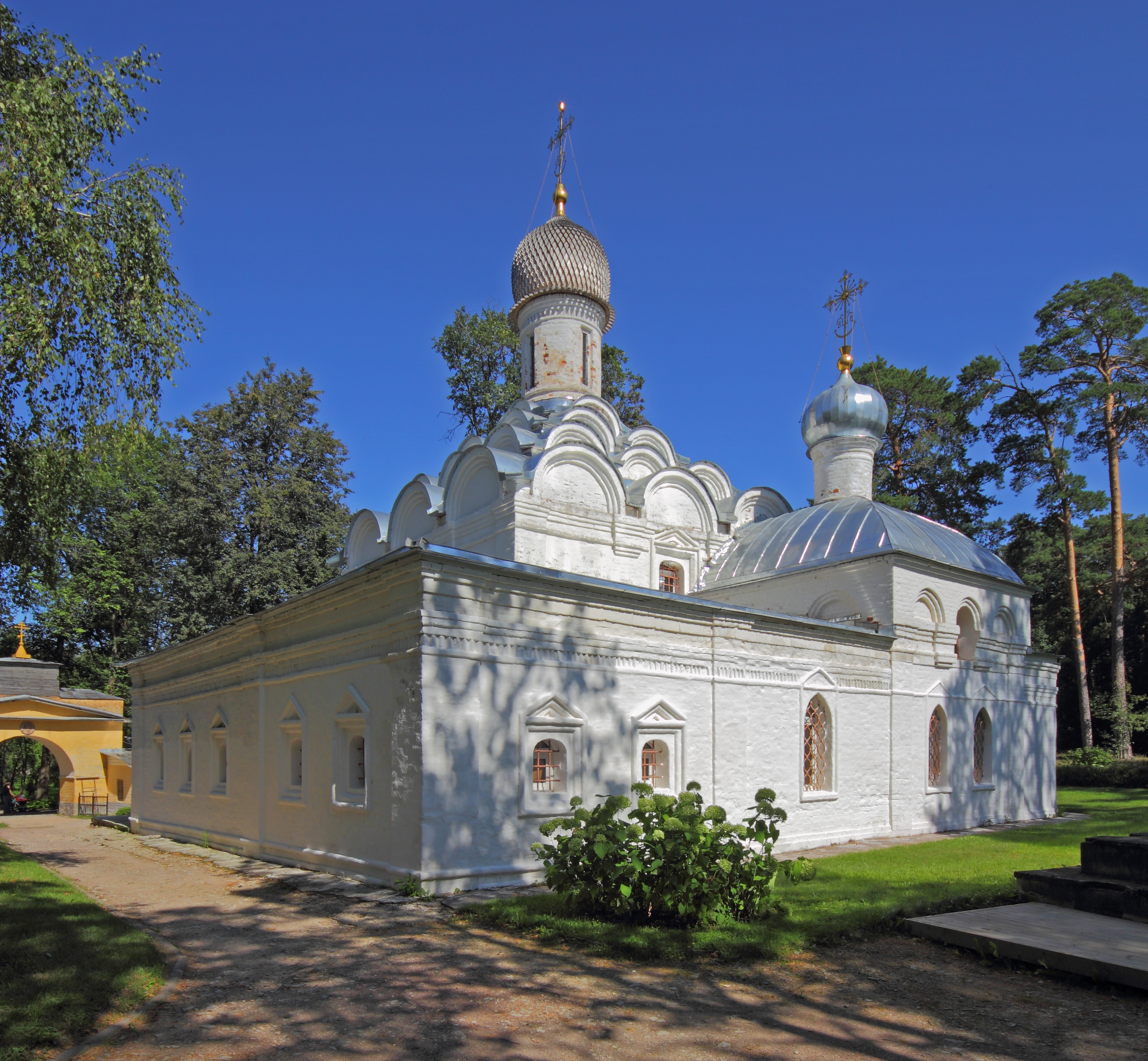
Church of Archangel Michael

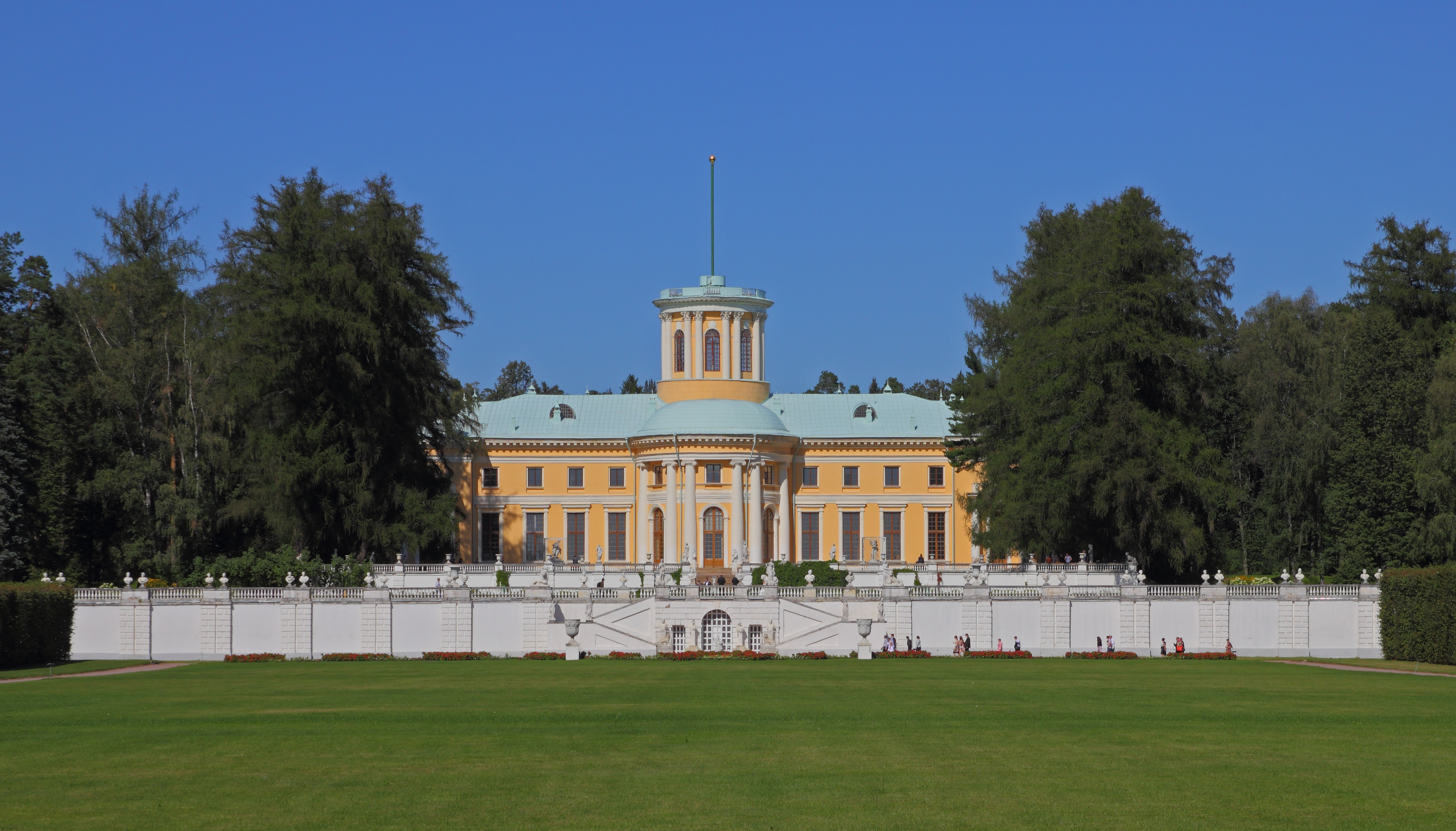
Distant view of the Grand Palace

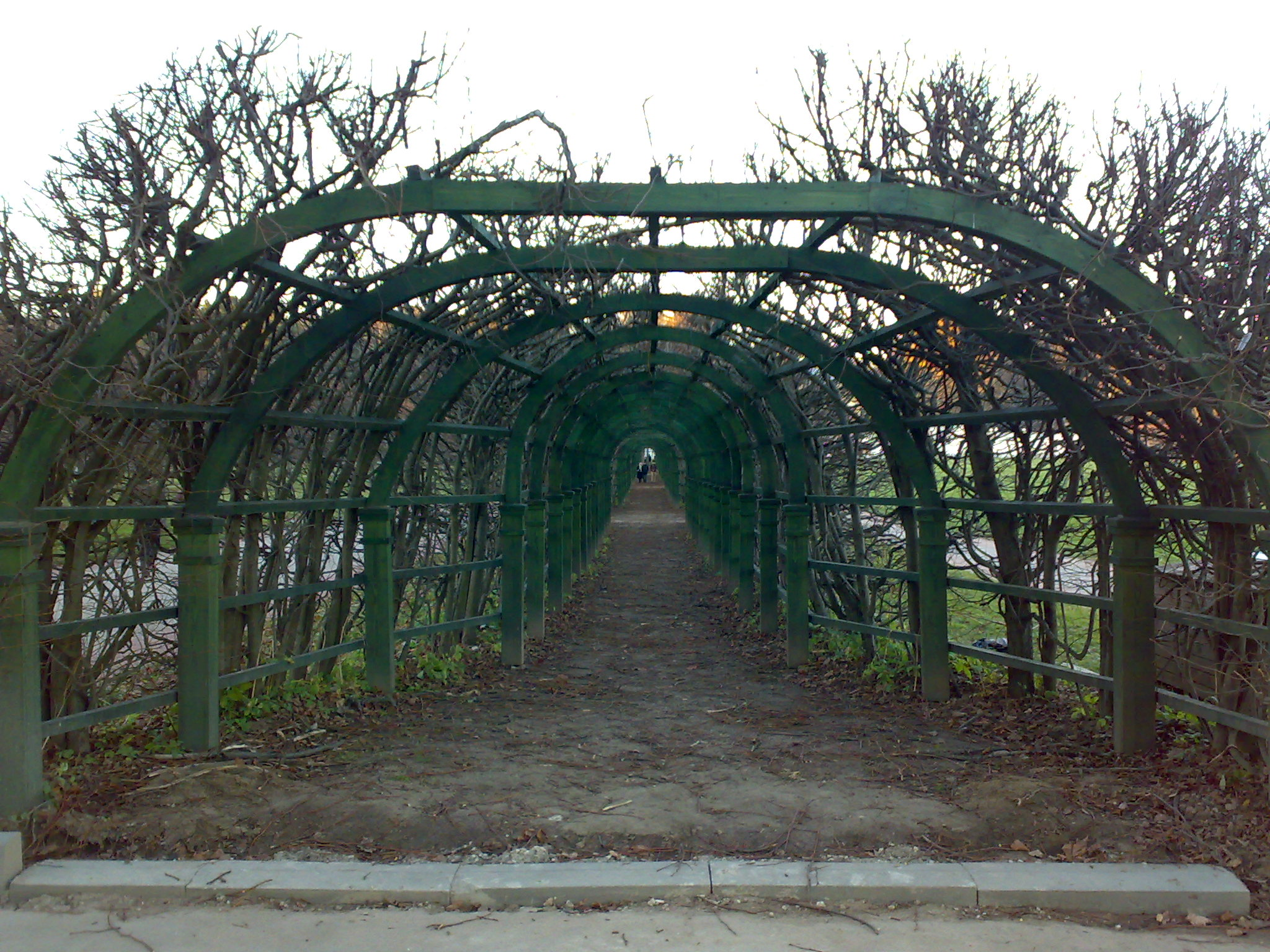
Trellis arches in November

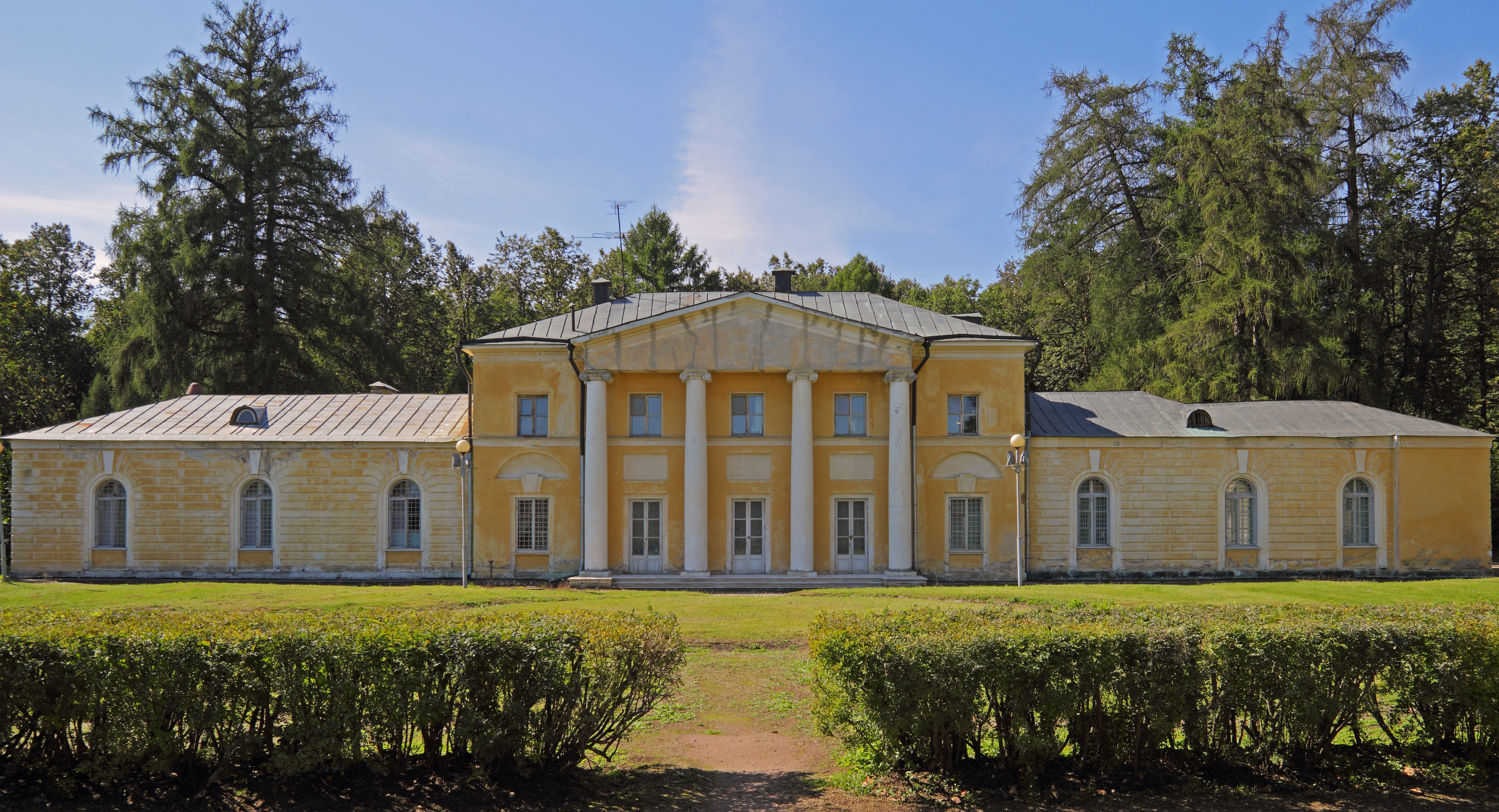
Small Palace

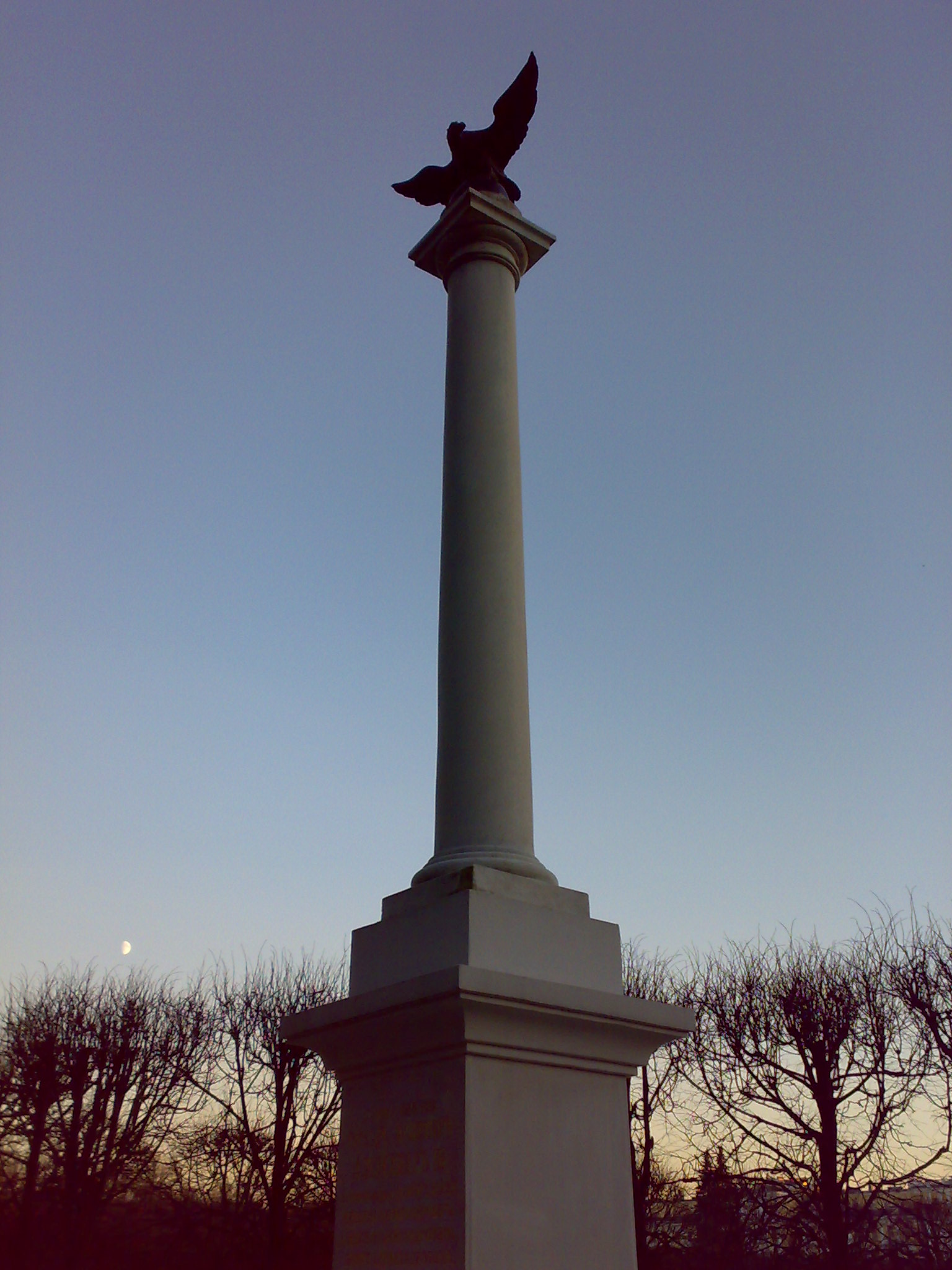
Alexander III Column

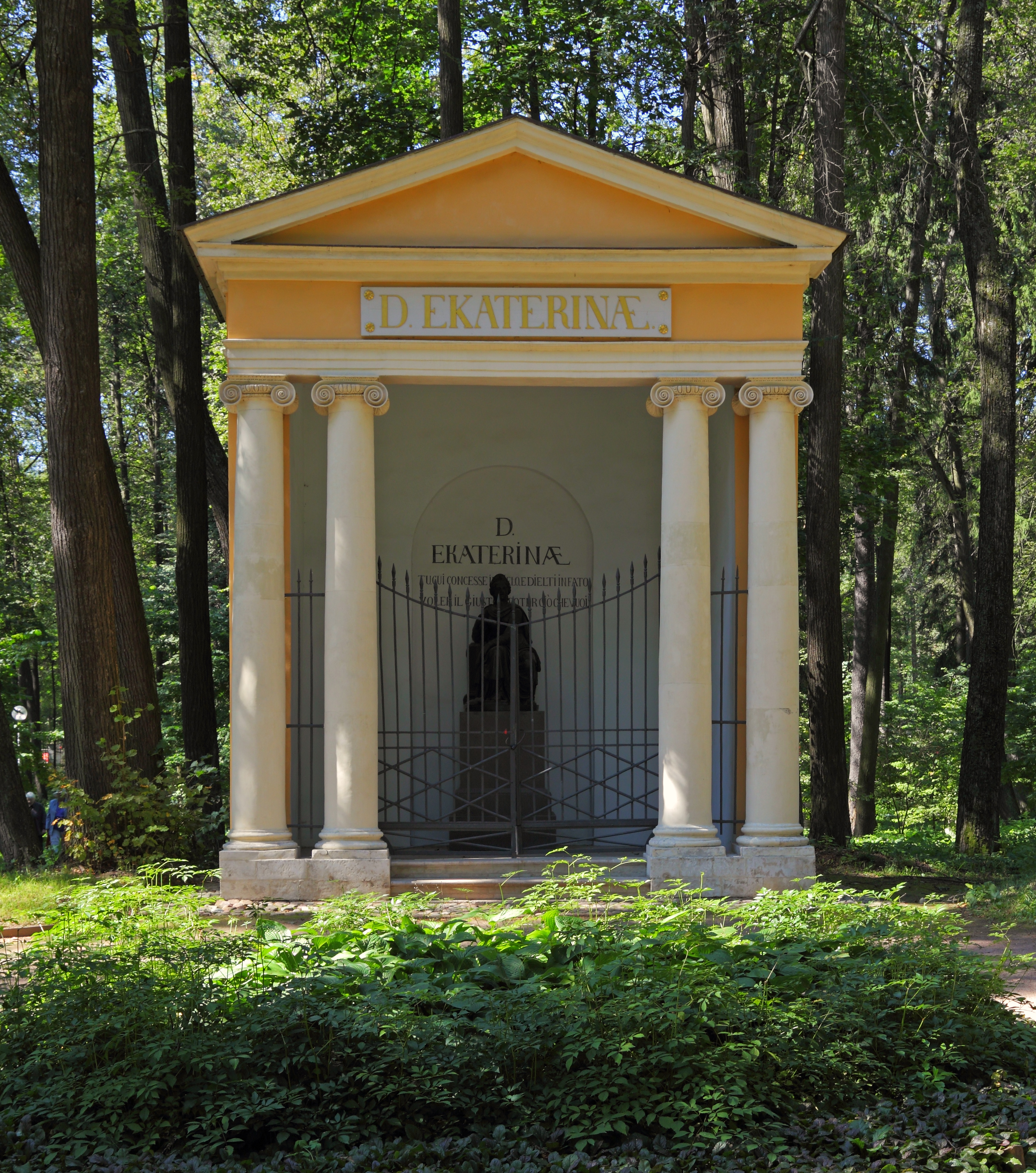
Catherine II monument

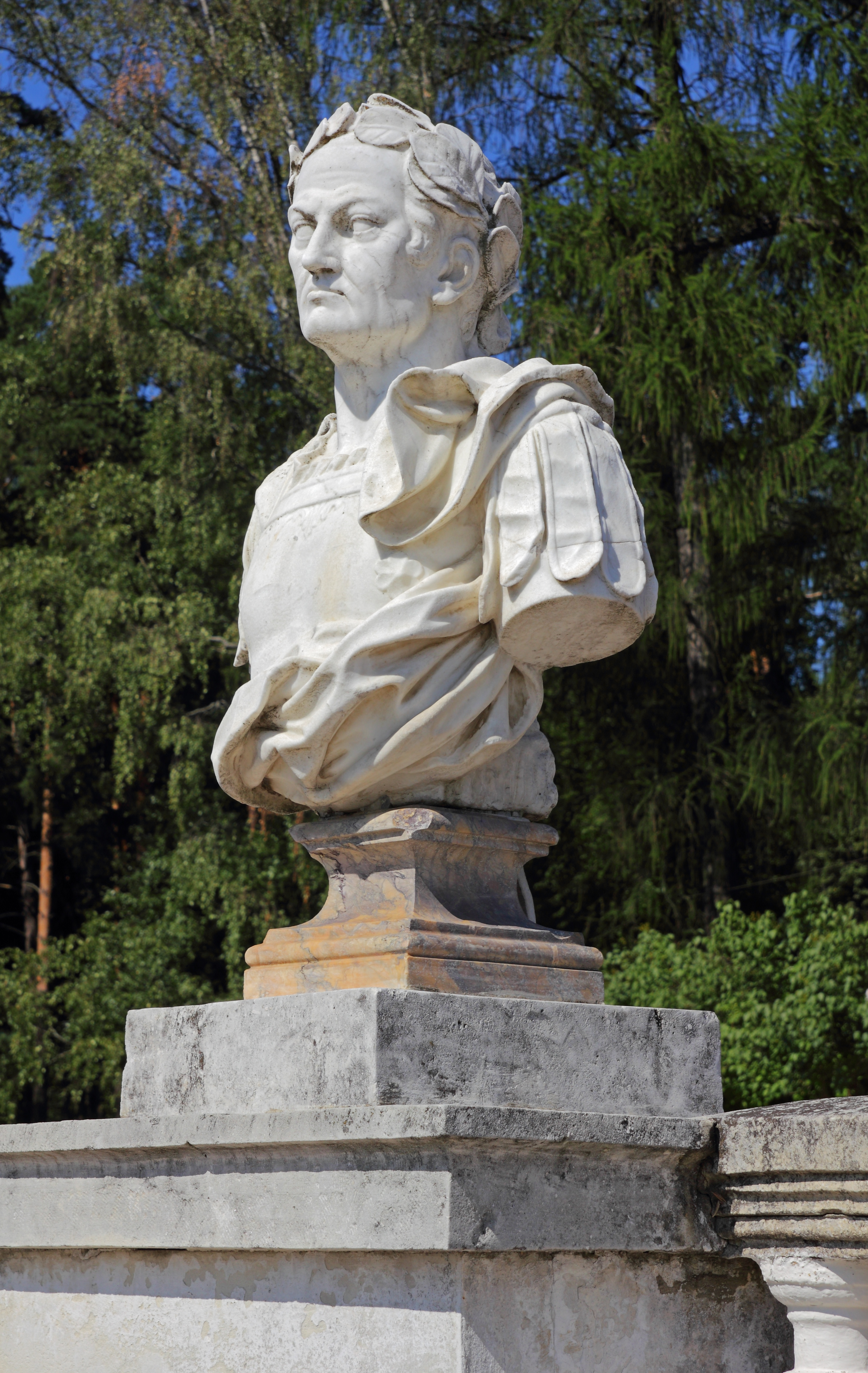

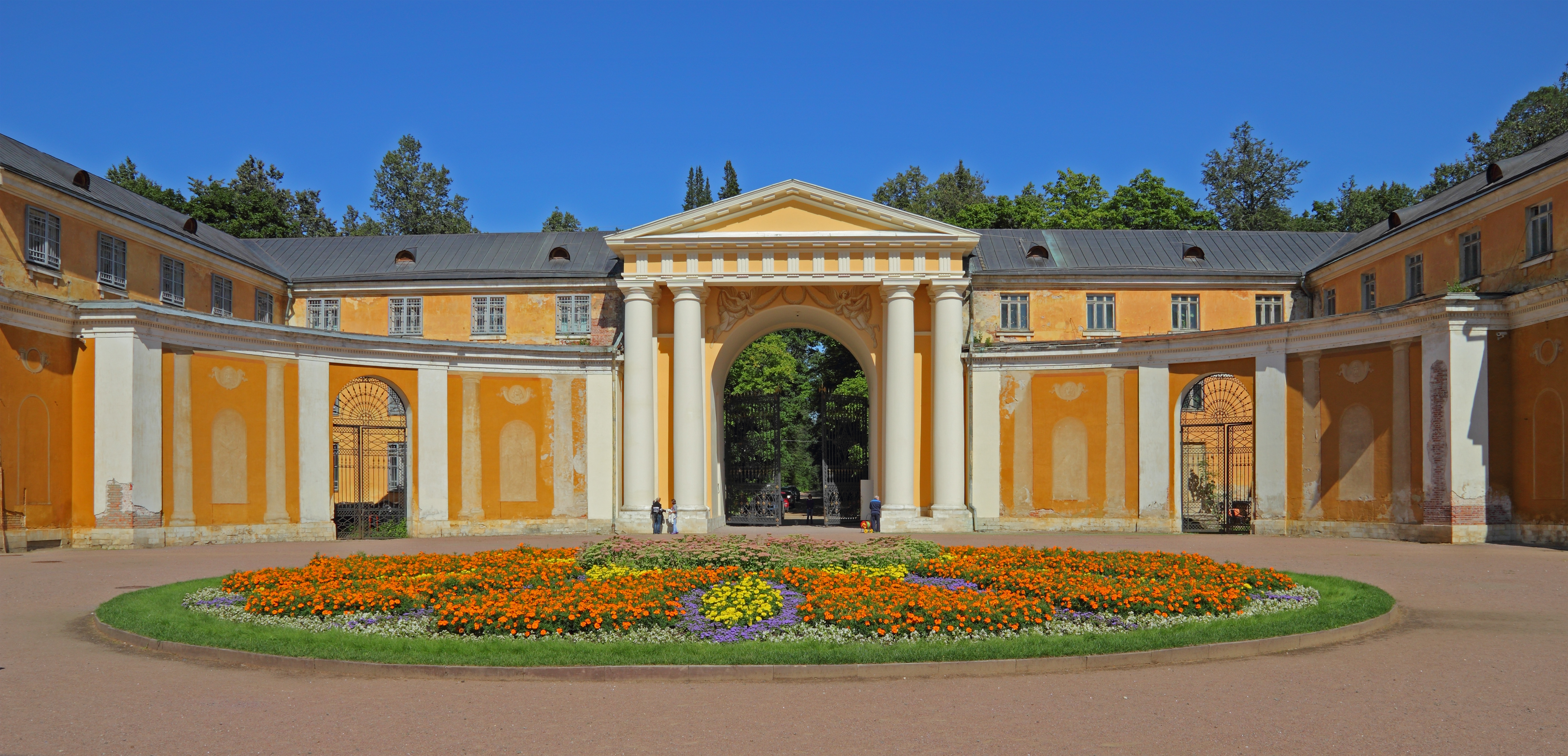

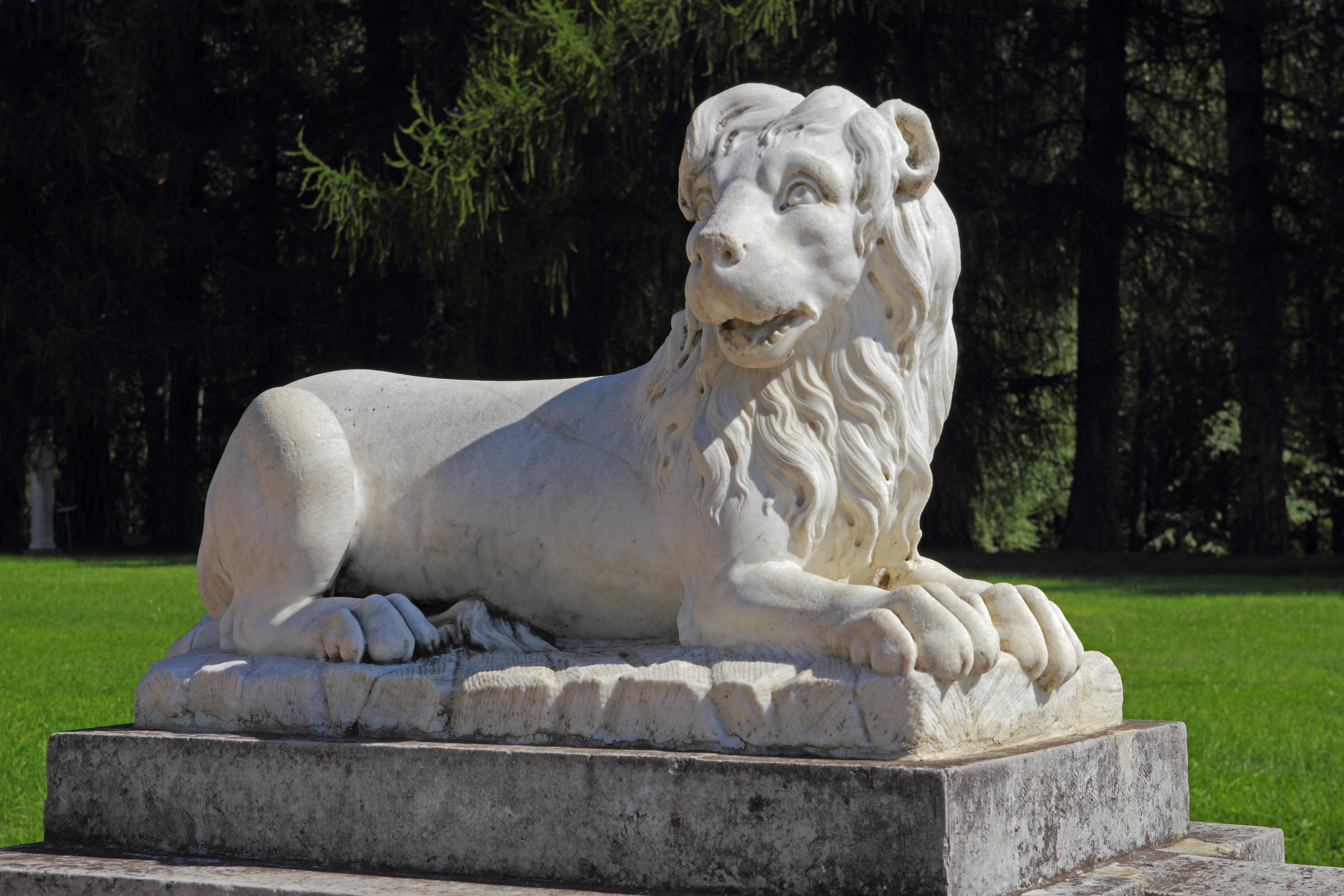

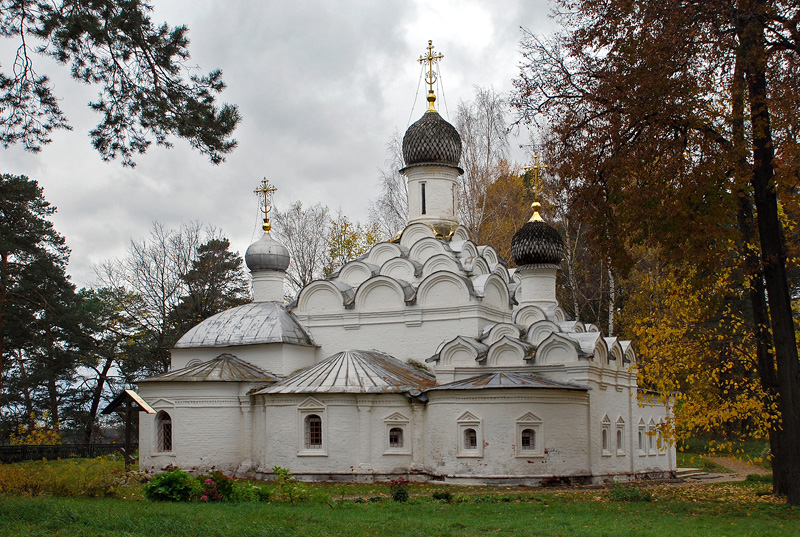

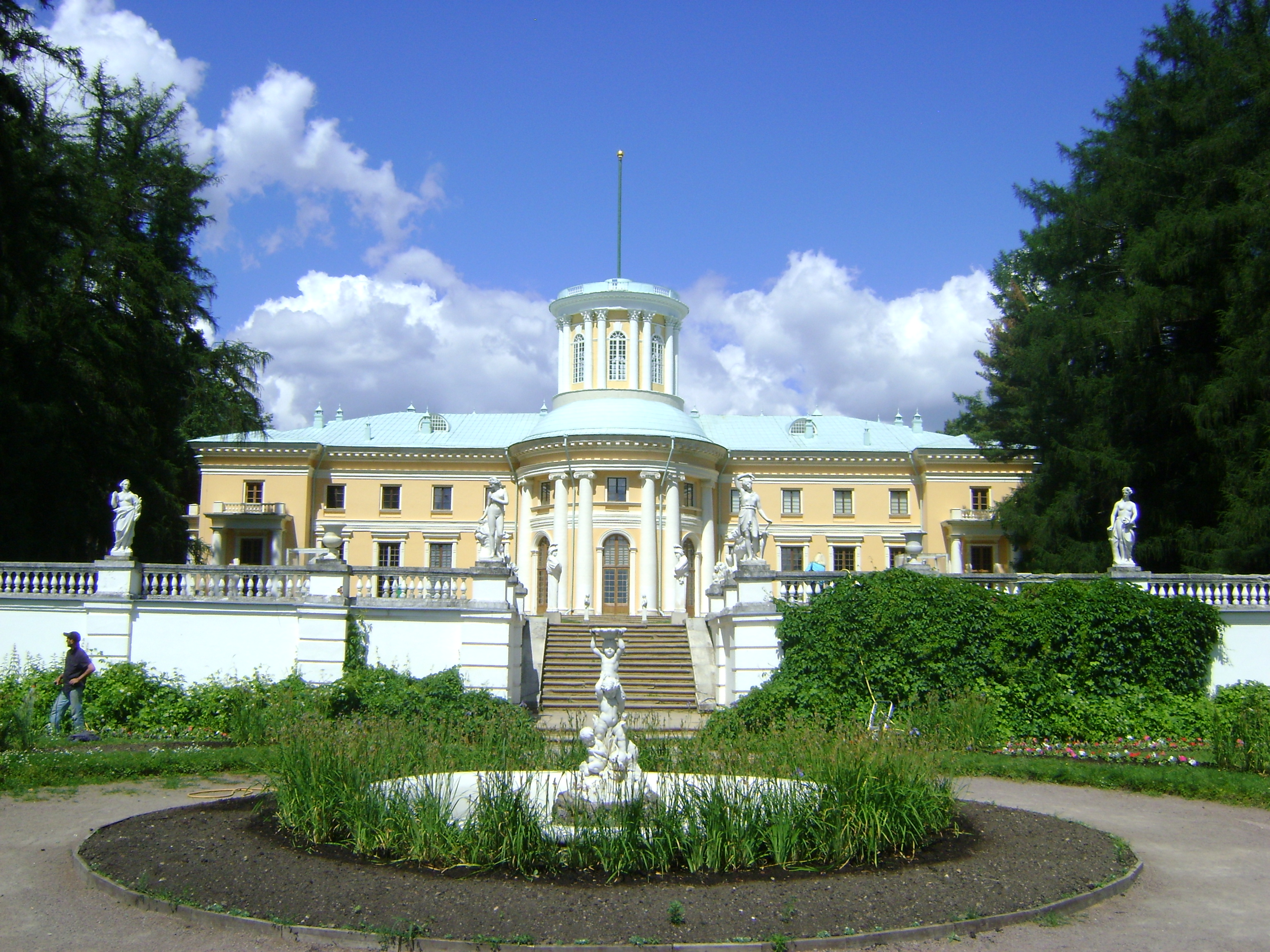

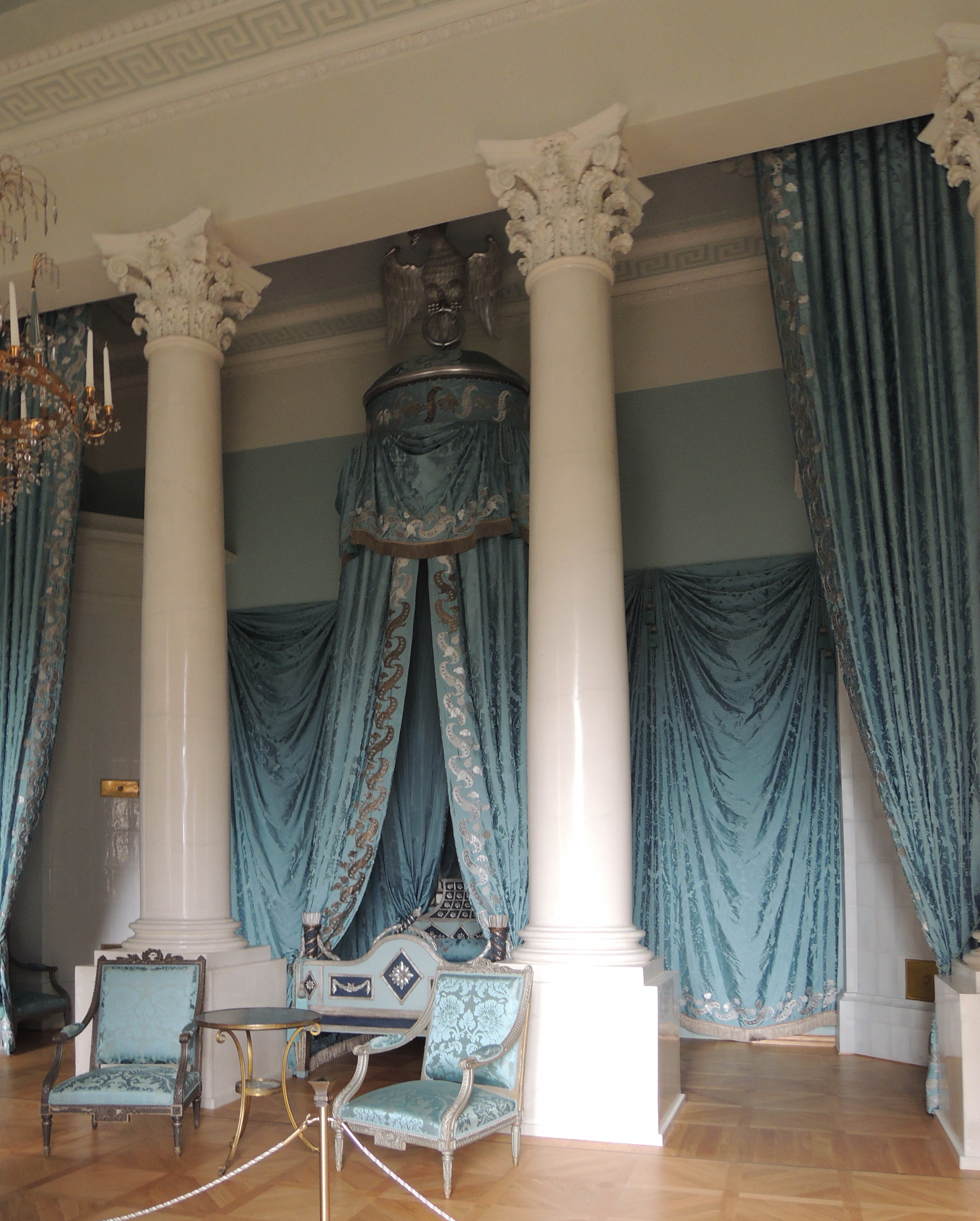

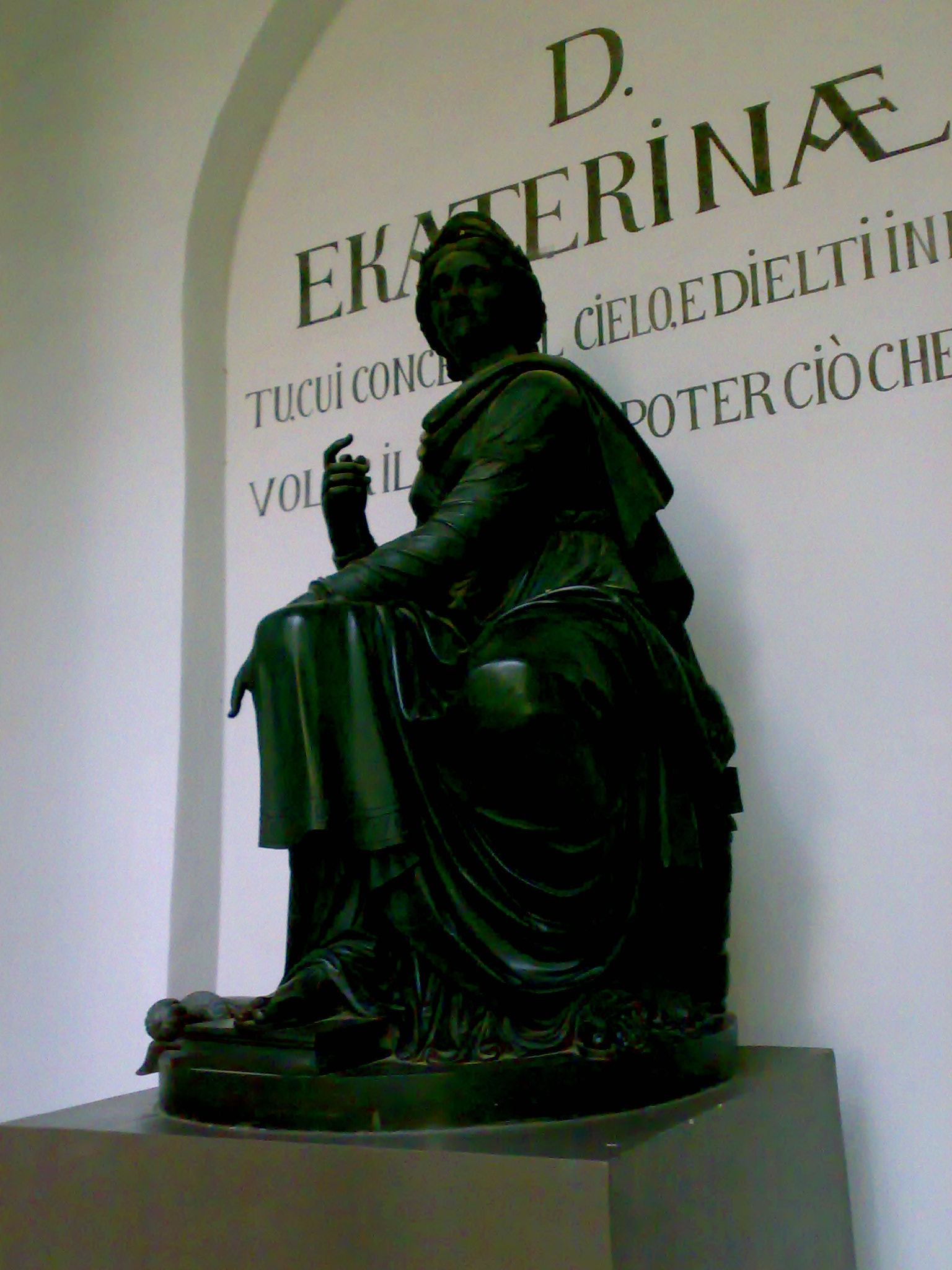

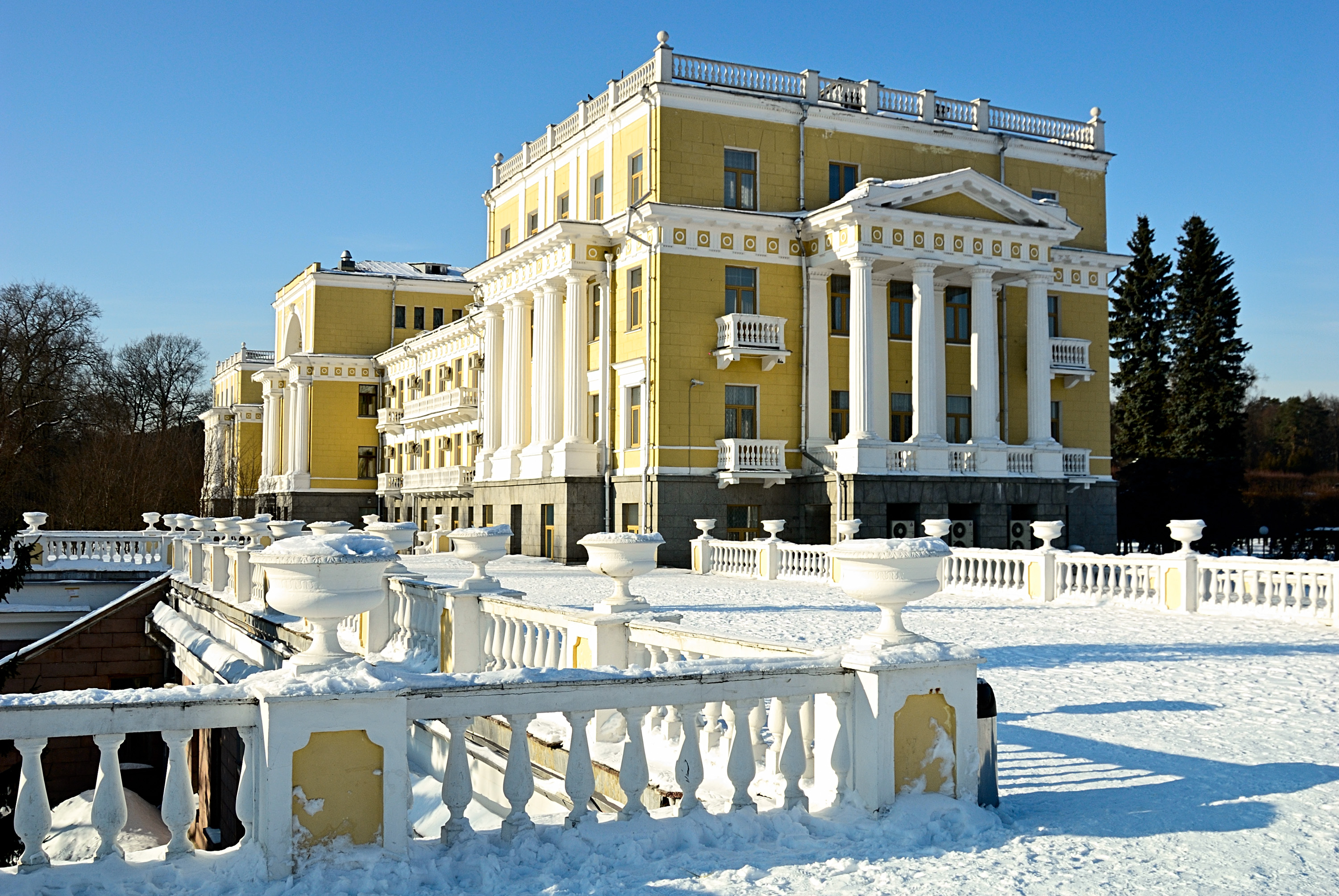

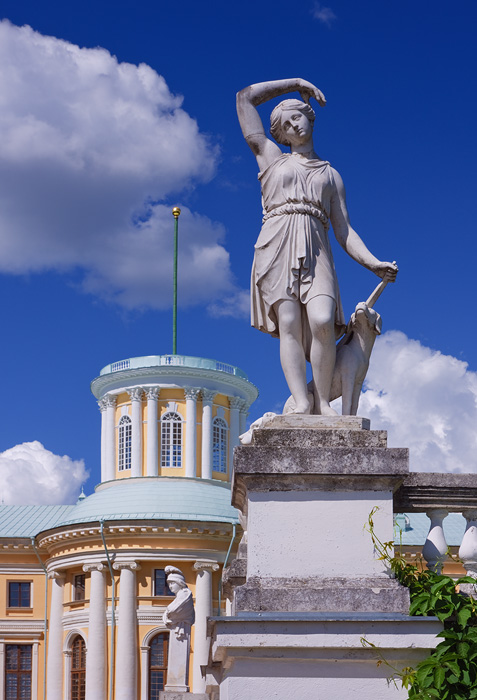

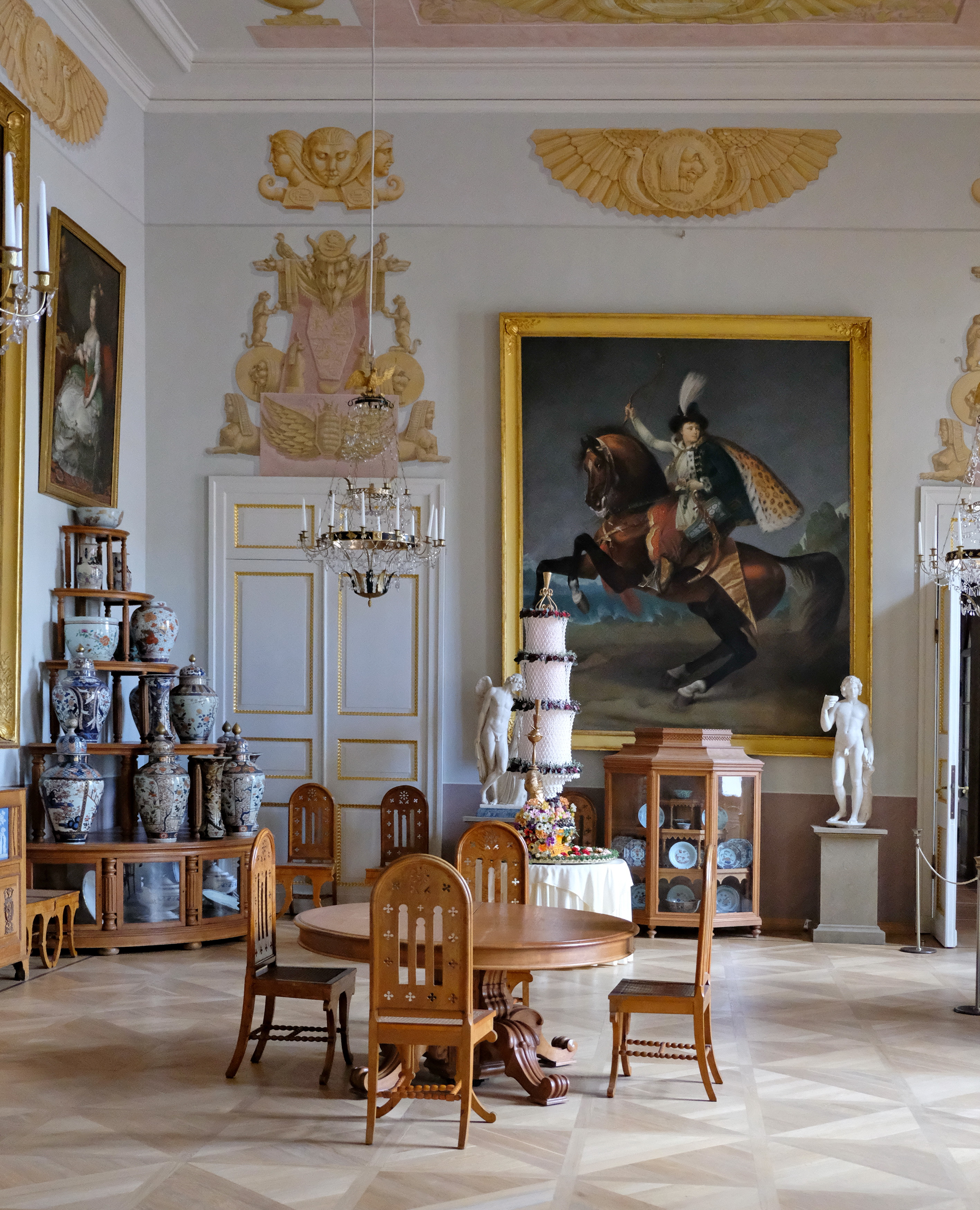
