= Sergei Tchoban =

German architect

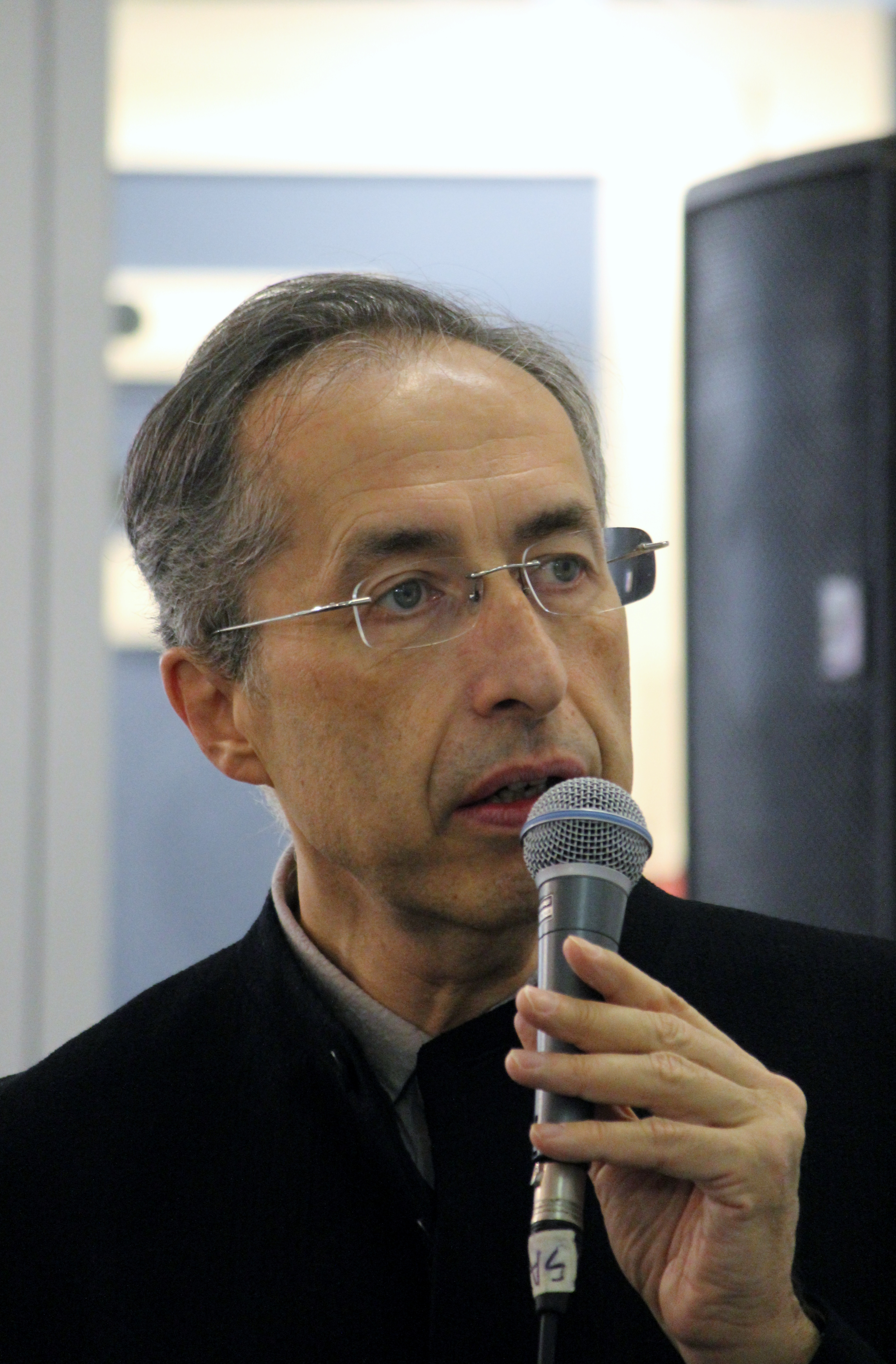
Sergei Tchoban

Sergei Tchoban (Russian: Сергей Чобан, German: Sergej Tschoban; born 9 October 1962 in Saint Petersburg) is a Russo-German architect and artist. He is a managing partner of the architectural firm TCHOBAN VOSS Architekten and founder of the Tchoban Foundation, which has been based in the Museum for Architectural Drawing in Berlin since 2013. Tchoban is member of the Association of German Architects (BDA) and the architectural associations in Hamburg and Berlin.

== Biography ==
Tchoban was born in St. Petersburg (back then Leningrad) into a family of scientists. His father, Enver Abdurakhmanovich Tchoban, was a physicist and professor at the Polytechnic University, and his mother, Irina Solomonovna Choban, worked there as a turbine engineer. His grandfather, Solomon Abramovich Kantor, was also a professor at the Polytechnic University.

From 1973 to 1980, Tchoban attended the Middle Art School of the Academy of Arts, and from 1980 to 1986 he studied at the Architecture Faculty of the State Academic Repin Institute of Painting, Sculpture and Architecture (class of Sergei Speranski and Valeryan Volonsevich). After graduating, he worked in the architectural workshop of Weniamin Fabrizkij until 1989, when he started working as a freelance architect in Leningrad.

In 1991, Tchoban moved to Germany and obtained German citizenship. In 1992 he was employed by the Hamburg office of Nietz Prasch Sigl, where he became a partner in 1995 and subsequently took over the Berlin branch. The office first changed its name to nps und partner Architekten BDA in 1996, then to nps tchoban voss Architekten in 2003, and after its re-establishment in 2017 it was given its current name, TCHOBAN VOSS Architekten.

== Career ==
Sergei Tchoban's designs were implemented in Berlin including the timber hybrid office ensemble EDGE Suedkreuz Berlin, das Holz-Hybrid Bürogebäude Dockyard Berlin, the new development Rosenthaler Strasse 43–45 with the Apple Store Rosenthaler Straße, the TechnoCampus Berlin, the office buildings Greifswalder Strasse 226 and Boxhagener Strasse 80, the Coca-Cola Germany headquarters, the Quartier LP 12 – Mall of Berlin, the Jewish Educational and Cultural Centre Chabad Lubavitch Berlin, the Hotel nhow Berlin, the Museum for Architectural Drawing a number of residential buildings including Living Levels, Ackerstrasse 29, the Koenigstadt-Quartier, Embassy- Living at Koellnischer Park, 3 Hoefe (3 Courtyards) or Schoenegarten as well as revitalisation projects such as Ernst-Reuter-Platz 6, Blissestrasse 5 or the New Kranzler Eck.

Sergei Tchoban is a draughtsman and collector of architectural drawings. With the aim of reviving public interest in the art of architectural drawing, he founded the Tchoban Foundation in 2009, which supports the Museum for Architectural Drawing in Berlin, which opened in 2013. In 2020, Tchoban was president of the American Society of Architectural Illustrators (ASAI), of which he has been a member since 1992. His drawings have been exhibited in numerous museums and galleries worldwide and can be found in the collections of the Victoria and Albert Museum in London, the Albertina in Vienna, the Oscar Niemeyer Museum in Curitiba, the Museo della Grafica in Pisa, the Istituto Centrale per la Grafica in Rome, the Academy of Arts and the Mies van der Rohe – House in Berlin, the Deutsches Architekturmuseum (DAM) in Frankfurt as well as in numerous private collections.

In 2018 Sergei Tchoban was awarded the European Prize for Architecture by the Chicago Athenaeum Museum of Architecture and Design for his complete works.

== Major buildings and projects ==
Germany

Tchoban's designs have been implemented in residential, office, and mixed-use complexes in Berlin and other German cities. Many of these buildings have received professional awards and are included in architectural guides.

Berlin

- 1999 – Arndt Gallery.
- 2001 – Cubix cinema, Alexanderplatz.
- 2006 – Reconstruction of Berolina House, a 20th-century architectural monument, Alexanderplatz.
- 2007 – Jewish Cultural Center and Synagogue Chabad Lubavitch on Munsterstrasse.
- 2010 – Hamburger Hof multifunctional complex.
- 2010 – nHow hotel.
- 2013 – Coca-Cola Headquarters.
- 2013 – Museum for Architectural Drawing
- 2014 – Mall of Berlin multifunctional complex on Leipziger Platz.
- 2015 – Living Levels residential complex – East Side Tower.
- 2015 – The White residential building.
- 2016 – Ackerstrasse 29, residential building.
- 2018 – Refurbishment, conversion and extension of a listed ensemble, Neues Kranzler Eck.
- 2018 – Jeweller Flagshipstore, Kurfuerstendamm 214 / 215.
- 2018 – Alte Schoenhauser 5, residential ensemble.
- 2018 – Boxhagener Strasse, new block of buildings with residential and office use.
- 2019 – Hotel Amo by Amano Friedrichstrasse 113.
- 2019 – Office building Spreeoffice.
- 2019 – New construction of the office business centre Greifswalder Strasse / Heinrich-Roller-Strasse.
- 2019 – Conversion, modernisation and extension of the former Alhambra cinema palace (Berlin) and later "Hotel am Kurfuerstendamm" at Kurfuerstendamm 68 in Berlin-Charlottenburg into an office and commercial building with residential use.
- 2020 – New construction of two office buildings at Seestrasse.
- 2020 – Total refurbishment of an office and commercial building with underground car park, Blissestrasse 5.
- 2021 – New construction of a residential high-rise building, Koenigstadt-Quartier.
- 2021 – New construction of a residential building, EMBASSY – Living alongside Koellnischer Park.
- 2021 – New construction of the commercial building ensemble Rosenthaler Strasse 43–45 with the Apple Store Rosenthaler Strasse.
- 2021 – New construction of a multifunctional office campus with underground car park, Cuvry Campus / Neuer Spreespeicher, planning TCHOBAN VOSS Architekten, Design Reinhard Müller.
- 2021 – New construction of residential buildings in Bachstrasse.
- 2022 – 3 Hoefe (3 courtyards), new office and residential building with underground car park.
- 2022 – Schoenegarten Kurfuerstenstrasse, New construction of 14 multi-storey residential buildings with retail zone.
- 2022 – TechnoCampus Berlin, New construction of two office buildings, an underground car park and a multi-storey car park as well as parking spaces.
- 2022 – Leo & Alex, New construction of two office buildings in Berlin-Lichtenberg.
- 2022 – Stralauer Platz 29–31, New construction of a hotel and office building with underground car park.
- 2022 – Ernst-Reuter-Platz 6, Renovation and partial new construction of an office building.
- 2022 – New construction of two office buildings in sustainable timber hybrid construction: Vattenfall Germany Headquarters / EDGE Suedkreuz Berlin.

Other cities in Germany

- 1997 – The Java Tower, Hamburg.
- 2006 – C&A headquarters, Duesseldorf.
- 2008 – Multifunctional complex on Kaiserstrasse, Karlsruhe.
- 2009 – E-plus headquarters, Düsseldorf.
- 2010 – Meininger Hotel, Frankfurt am Main.
- 2014 – INNSIDE by Meliã Hotel, Wolfsburg.
- 2017 – Russian Monastery church of St. Georg Goetschendorf.
- 2021 – New construction of four townhouses with commercial space and underground car park, Brauerstrasse 4–7, Potsdam.

International

- 2003 – Federation Tower as part of the Moscow International Business Center "Moscow-City" was conceived together with the German engineer, Professor Peter Schweger.
- 2015 – Dukley Gardens, Montenegro.
- 2017 – Hyatt Regency Petrovsky Park hotel, Moscow.
- 2017 – Neva-Towers, Moscow.
- 2017 – Federation Tower.
- 2025: art museum Kollekzia, Moscow
- 2021 – Perm Museum of Contemporary Art, Russia

== Awards ==
Buildings and complexes by Sergei Tchoban both in Germany and in Russia have won numerous national and international professional awards.

- In 1998, the Trabrennbahn Farmsen residential complex (Hamburg) won the urban development Walter Hesselbach Prize.
- In 2003, the Cubix cinema building (Berlin) was awarded a prize from the Association of German Interior Architects (BDIA).
- In 2005, the DomAquarée complex received the German Award for Natural Stone.
- In 2008, the House by the Sea built in St. Petersburg, won the Gold award in the Construction category at the 16th International Festival of Architecture and Design, Zodchestvo – 2008.
- In 2009, the interior of the Jewish Cultural Center and Synagogue Chabad Lubavitch in Berlin was awarded the ArchiP prize for the best public interior in the Tradition category.
- In 2009, the Benois House built in St. Petersburg in an open public vote won the Building of the Year: People's Choice in the Best Building Awards.
- In 2009, the Federation complex (Moscow) won in the category Office Buildings of the FIABCI Prix d'Excellence Awards.
- In 2010, the building of the Jewish Cultural Center and Synagogue Chabad Lubavitch (Berlin, Germany) was a winner of the International Architecture Awards 2010.
- In 2011, Sergei Tchoban was awarded the Ivan Bazhenov Medal by the Union of Architects of Russia "For high architectural mastery".
- In 2011, the office building on Leninsky Prospekt (Moscow) won in the category Building of the Year. People's Choice.
- In 2011, the multifunctional business center with the headquarters of OJSC Saint Petersburg Bank was awarded the Gold award in the first Russian Glass in Architecture context.
- In 2011, the NHow Berlin hotel received the 2011 Immobilien Award Berlin.
- In 2011, the Hamburger Hof complex (Berlin, Germany) was a winner of the International Architecture Awards 2011.
- In 2012, at the Arch Moscow International Exhibition of Architecture, Sergei Tchoban with Sergey Kuznetsov were chosen as Architect of the Year.
- In 2012, the VTB Group office in the Federation complex (Moscow) won the Grand Prix prize in the Best Office Awards 2012.
- In 2012, the office building on Leninsky Prospekt (Moscow) received 5 stars status in the category Best Office Building in the International Property Awards 2012. Granatniy 6 residential complex received the status of Highly Commended in the category Apartment Buildings in the same competition.
- In 2012, "i-city/i-land" won a special prize of the jury at the 13th Architecture Biennale in Venice.
- In 2013, "i-city/i-land" received the awards Iconic Awards 2013 and Interior Design's Best of Year Awards 2013.
- In 2013, the building of the Museum for Architectural Drawing (Berlin, Germany) was awarded the prize Highly Commended Architectural Review Future Projects Awards 2013 (as the project), Iconic Interior Design's Best of Year Awards 2013 and AR Emerging Architecture Awards (as the building) and received the status of Highly Commended in the World Architecture Festival in Singapore.
- In 2014, the building of the Museum for Architectural Drawing (Berlin, Germany) was awarded the prize The International Architecture Award 2014 nominated at the prize DAM Award for Architecture in Germany, and also received a special prize of the jury, the AIT Award in 2014, and Architizer A + Awards 2014.
- In 2014, Finalist of the international competition of architectural drawing KRob
- In 2014, Sergei Tchoban won the jury prize of the 40th international competition of architectural drawing KRob (USA) and a special prize of the jury of the American Society of Architectural Illustrators (ASAI).
- In 2015, Sergei Tchoban was a winner of the American Society of Architectural Illustrators (ASAI) 30th international competition of architectural drawings, Architecture in Perspective, having received the Award of Excellence in the category Drawing from Nature and the Informal Category Award for the best fantasy-sketch.
- In 2015, the building of the Museum for Architectural Drawing (Berlin, Germany) was awarded the 3d prize of The German Annual award, Heinze Architekten AWARD 2015 and received the status of Winner of the category Architecture and Urban Space of German Design Award.
- In 2015, the building of Innside Hotel in Wolfsburg (Germany) was a winner of the International Architecture Awards 2015 (Hospitality category).
- In 2015, the building of multifunctional business center Lotos (Moscow) became a winner of the category Best office center of Best Built Project Award 2015.
- In 2015, the Lotus multifunctional complex (Moscow, Russia) was awarded in the category The Best Implemented Office Buildings and Business Center Construction Project in the competition The Best Implemented Project in the Field of Construction.
- In 2015, the Lotus multifunctional complex (Moscow, Russia) was recognized as the best in the category Office Property in the national phase of the FIABCI World Prix d'Excellence Awards 2015.
- In 2015, the "V lesu" microcity residential complex was recognized as the best in the category Residential (High Rise) in the national phase of the FIABCI World Prix d'Excellence Awards 2015.
- In 2015, the Lotus multifunctional complex (Moscow, Russia) was recognized with Silver Sign of International Architectural festival Zodchestvo.
- In 2016, Finalist of the international competition of architectural drawing KRob
- In 2017, Sergei Tchoban's drawing "Dead-End 1 (from the series "Totalitarianism and Architecture")", received commended entry of World Architectural Festival´s (WAF) Inaugural Architecture Drawing Prize
- In 2017, Finalist of the international competition of architectural drawing KRob
- In 2018, Sergei Tchoban was a winner of the American Society of Architectural Illustrators (ASAI) having received the Best Informal Drawing award and Observational Best in Show award
- In 2018, Sergei Tchoban won the Gold Medal in the First Athens Architecture Club Exhibition, organized by the Chicago Athenaeum and The European Centre for Architecture Art Design
- In 2018, Sergei Tchoban receives the European Prize of Architecture
- In 2021, the building of Seestrasse 66–67 (Berlin, Germany) has been selected as a Special Mention in the Architizer A+ Awards for the PLUS > DETAILS > Architecture +Brick category
- 2022 – FIABCI Prix d'Excellence Germany 2022, BFW Bundesverband Freier Immobilien- und Wohnungsunternehmen e.V. and FIABCI Deutsche Delegation e.V., Gold, Commercial category, Project: EDGE Suedkreuz Berlin, Berlin, Germany

== Exhibitions ==
Sergei Tchoban is an author, curator and participant of numerous art and architecture exhibitions held in Russia and abroad.

- 1996, AEDES gallery, Berlin – "The Java Tower"
- 1999, AEDES gallery, Berlin – "Five Painted Worlds"
- 2001, Gallery of the German Institute for Foreign Cultural Relations (IFA) – "Drawing Archive of Moscow." Exhibited in Berlin, Bonn and Stuttgart.
- 2003, The Shchusev State Museum of Architecture, Moscow – "S. Tchoban's Archaeology of Moscow"
- 2005, AEDES gallery, Berlin – "Sergei Tchoban. Berlin-Moscow. New projects"
- 2005, The Shchusev State Museum of Architecture, Moscow – "Peter Schweger. Sergei Tchoban. Federation Tower"
- 2007, Academy of Fine Arts Museum, St. Petersburg – "Peter Schweger. Sergei Tchoban. Architecture for the City"
- 2007, Berlin Architecture Gallery (Architektur Galerie Berlin), Berlin – "Petersburg Hanging"
- 2008, 11th Architecture Biennale in Venice – participant of the Russian pavilion "ArChess" exposition
- 2008, Hellerau Museum, Dresden – "Drawing, design, building"
- 2009, Galleria Antonia Jannone, Disegni di Architettura Milan – "Water. Drawings by Sergei Tchoban "
- 2009, AEDES gallery, Berlin – "Sretenka's New Life. Reconstructing the Historic Quarter"
- 2009, AEDES gallery, Berlin – "Europe Embankment"
- 2009, 17th International Festival of Architecture, Zodchestvo – 2009, Manezh, Moscow – "(NE)PRIKOSNOVENNIY ZAPAS" ("(Not) for emergency only")
- 2010, 12th Architectural Biennale in Venice – "Russia Factory ", dedicated to the revival of the city Vishny Volochek (curator of the exhibition together with P. Khoroshilov, G. Revzin)
- 2010, German Architecture Museum (DAM), Frankfurt am Main – "Architectural Worlds"
- 2010, Pushkin State Museum of Fine Arts, Moscow – "The Golden Age of Architectural Illustrations"
- 2011, École des Beaux-Arts, Paris – "In Search of Antiquity"
- 2012, The State Hermitage Museum, St. Petersburg – "Library of Architecture"
- 2012, INTERNI exhibition, Milan – "The Eye of the Architect" installation (with Sergey Kuznetsov)
- 2012, 13th Architectural Biennale in Venice – Russian Pavilion exhibition "i-city/ i-land" (curator of the exhibition, with Grigory Revzin, co-curators Valery Kashirina, Sergey Kuznetsov)
- 2013, 17th Arch Moscow International Exhibition of Architecture in Moscow – "Architect of the Year" (with Sergey Kuznetsov)
- 2013, INTERNI exhibition, Milan – installation "Golden River" (with Sergey Kuznetsov and Italian artist Marco Bravura)
- 2013, Sir John Soane's Museum, London – "Northern Vision"
- 2014, INTERNI exhibition, Milan – installation «U_Cloud» (with Sergey Kuznetsov and Agniya Sterligova)
- 2014, The State Tretyakov Gallery, Moscow – "All About Italy!"
- 2014, The Shchusev State Museum of Architecture, Moscow – "The Forge of Great Architecture" (exhibition curator)
- 2015, The Jewish Museum and Tolerance Center, Moscow – "Losing Face", Jan Vanriet (author of the exposition, with architect Agniya Sterligova)
- 2015, World Exhibition EXPO-2015, Milan – Russia's pavilion
- 2015, INTERNI exhibition, Milan – "Living Line" installation (with Sergey Kuznetsov and Agniya Sterligova)
- 2015, SpazioFMG Gallery, Milan – exhibition "Realta e Fantasia"
- 2015, Archstoyanie land art festival, Kaluzhskaya region, Russia – Museum of Rural Labour (with architect Agniya Sterligova).
- 2015, Cornell University, United States – exhibition "Treasure, Legacy"
- 2015, Square Brussels, Belgium – exhibition "Glazing the Future"
- 2016, ARCH MOSCOW, Russia – exhibition "National Tourist Roads in Norway"
- 2016, INTERNI exhibition, Milan – "Towers" installation (with Sergey Kuznetsov and Agniya Sterligova)
- 2016, Multimedia Art Museum, Russia – exhibition "SPEECH project"
- 2016, Tretyakov Gallery, Russia – exhibition "Roma Aeterna"
- 2016, Tretyakov Gallery, Russia – exhibition "Kandinsky. Counterpoint" (with architect Agniya Sterligova)
- 2017, Tretyakov Gallery, Russia – exhibition "Giorgio de Chirico. Metaphysical Insights" (with architect Agniya Sterligova)
- 2017, INTERNI exhibition, Milan "City DNA" installation (with Sergey Kuznetsov and Agniya Sterligova, shortlist World Architecture Festival 2017)
- 2017, First Russian Youth Architectural Biennale, Kazan – curator, chairman of the Jury
- 2017, Museum Exhibition Complex, Russia – "New Jerusalem", exhibition designer (together with architect Agniya Sterligova)
- 2017, A+D Architecture and Design Museum, Los Angeles – exhibition "Sergei Tchoban: Architectural Drawings"
- 2018, Museum of Architecture, Wrocław – exhibition "Sergei Tchoban: Contrasting Harmony of the City"
- 2018, Tokyo Art Museum, Tokyo – exhibition "Sergei Tchoban: Dreams of Frozen Music"
- 2018, La Biennale del Disegno di Rimini – exhibition "Sergei Tchoban: Capricci Russi"
- 2018, ARCH MOSCOW, Russia – installation "Living in Nature"
- 2018, ST PETERSBURG 2103 EXHIBITION, Russia – exhibition "Sergei Tchoban and Ioann Zelenin – Imprint of the Future"
- 2018, Antonia Jannone Disegni di Architettura, Milano – exhibition "Sergei Tchoban: Den-City – Urban Landscape"
- 2018, Gallery of the Shanghai Study Center, Shanghai – exhibition "Sergei Tchoban: Drawing Buildings/Building Drawings"
- 2018, Raumgalerie, Stuttgart – exhibition "Sergei Tchoban: Visions/Projects"
- 2018, Vatican Museums, Rome – "Pilgrimage of Russian Art. From Dionysius to Malevich" exhibition designer (together with architect Agniya Sterligova)
- 2019, Draw Art Fair, London
- 2019, Tretyakov Gallery, Russia – exhibition design "Edvard Munch" (with architect Agniya Sterligova)
- 2019, 14th CURITIBA INTERNATIONAL BIENNIAL OF CONTEMPORARY ART, Brazil
- 2019, Mies van der Rohe House Lemke House – group exhibition "Movement as a Dream"
- 2021, Luigi Solito Galleria Contemporanea – former Lanificio complex, Napels – exhibition "PORTAL #2 – Naples / Berlin"
- 2021, Aedes Architecture Forum, Berlin – exhibition "TCHOBAN VOSS Architekten Re-Use"
- 2021, Museo della Grafica di Pisa / Palazzo Lanfranchi, Pisa, Italy – exhibition "Sergei Tchoban. Urban Visions between past and future"
- 2021, Pyotr Fomenko Workhop Theater, Moscow, Russia – exhibition "Sergei Tchoban. Searching for architecture"
- 2021, EXPO 2020 Dubai – Russia's pavilion
