= Lemke House =

Building by Ludwig Mies van der Rohe

Coordinates: 52°32′57″N 13°29′27″E

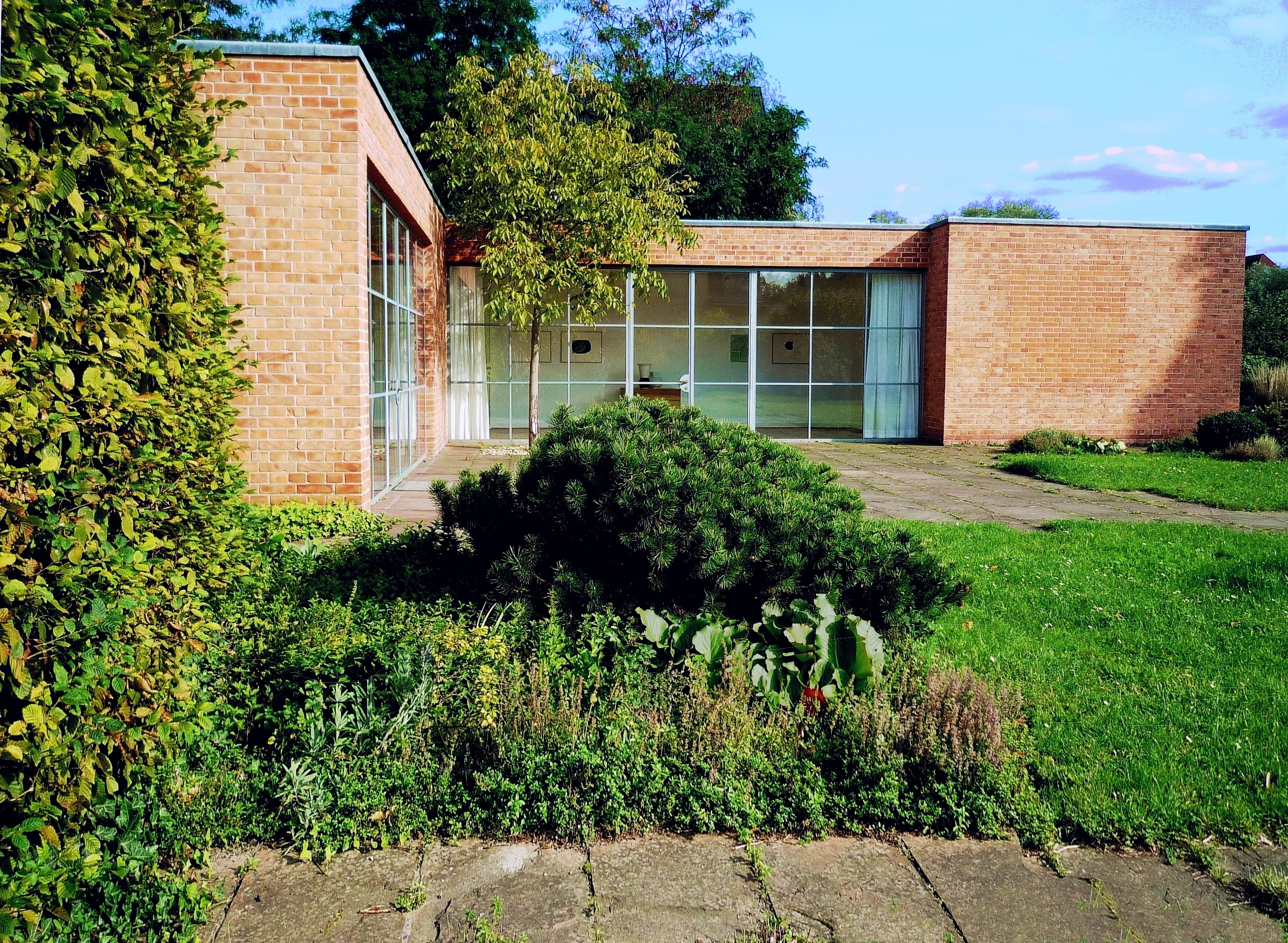
House Lemke, 2011

The Lemke House (also Landhaus Lemke or Mies van der Rohe Haus ) on Oberseestraße 60 in the Berlin district of Alt-Hohenschönhausen is the last house designed by Ludwig Mies van der Rohe in Germany before his emigration to the United States in 1938. It was built in Bauhaus style at the beginning of the 1930s under the name Villa Lemke.

== History ==
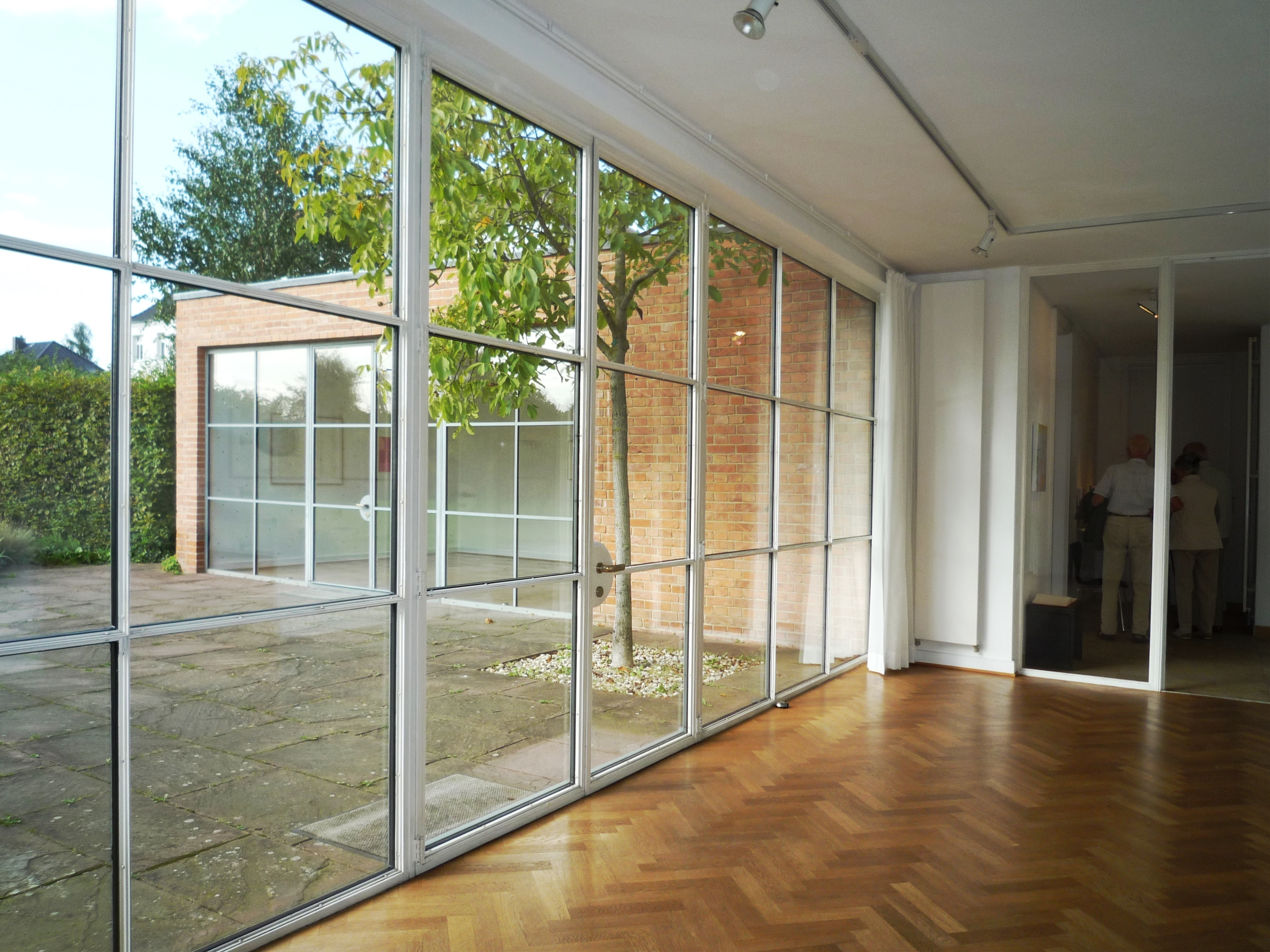
Interior

In 1932, the manufacturer couple Martha and Karl Lemke bought a two-storey property on the street with access to the Obersee. On the advice of an acquaintance, they contacted the renowned architect who was to carry out the construction. After several plans, mostly for a two-storey building, work began in the summer of 1932. The costs amounted to 16,000 Reichsmarks (purchasing power adjusted in today's currency: around 61,000 euros). In spring 1933 the Lemkes were able to move into their house. The L-shaped building is relatively simple and modest, but it also met the requirements of the childless couple.

The façade consists of red-coloured, charcoal-fired bricks which, together with the flat roof, make the house look peculiar. The furnishings are partly from the studio of Mies van der Rohe or were designed by his partner Lilly Reich. The Lemke couple lived in their villa for only a few years. In May 1945, after the occupation of Alt-Hohenschönhausen by the Red Army, the family was asked to leave the house as soon as possible. The surrounding area was declared a restricted area and the Villa Lemke was used as a garage and storage area.

Later on, some employees of the Stasi moved in and into the surrounding villas. This authority acquired the house in 1962 and made some serious changes to the house and garden. In 1977 the magistrate of Berlin put it on the district monument list.

As the house had visibly decayed by then, the first renovation work began in the 1980s, but without any notable success, as the funds made available were insufficient. Until Die Wende, the house was used as a laundry and canteen for the employees of the Ministry. The garden was partially concreted and used as a car park. In 1990, the district of Alt-Hohenschönhausen took over the property and house from the Ministry and officially renamed it Mies van der Rohe Haus.

The necessary renovation work followed in the years 2000 to 2002. Since 1994 a sculpture by the Berlin artist Ruth Baumann has been standing in the garden of the house. The title of the work is Aufsicht um die Kante (in English: Surveillance around the edge). Today, the house serves as an exhibition pavilion for modern art and attracts the lovers of Mies van der Rohe's architecture.

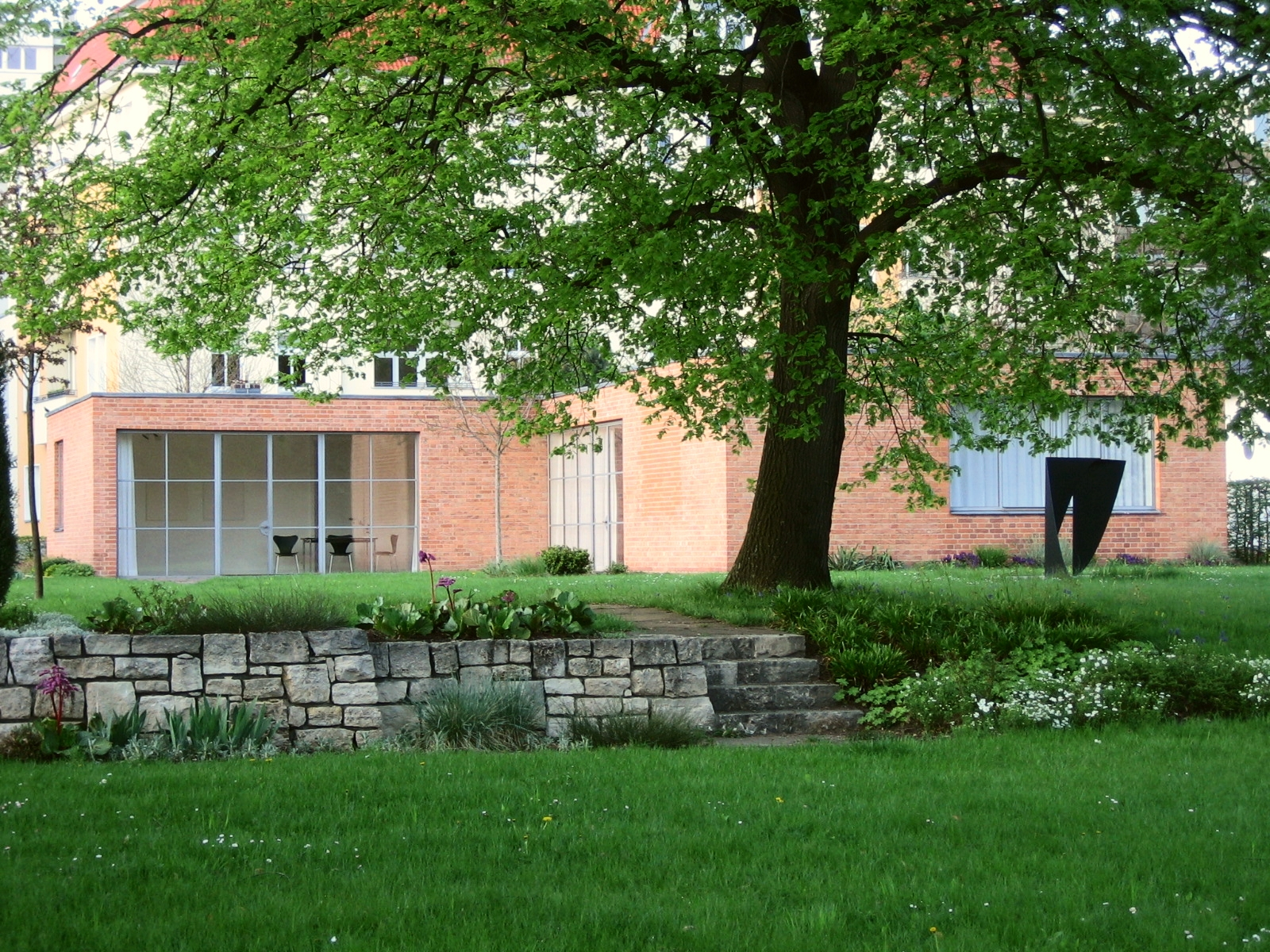
View from the south

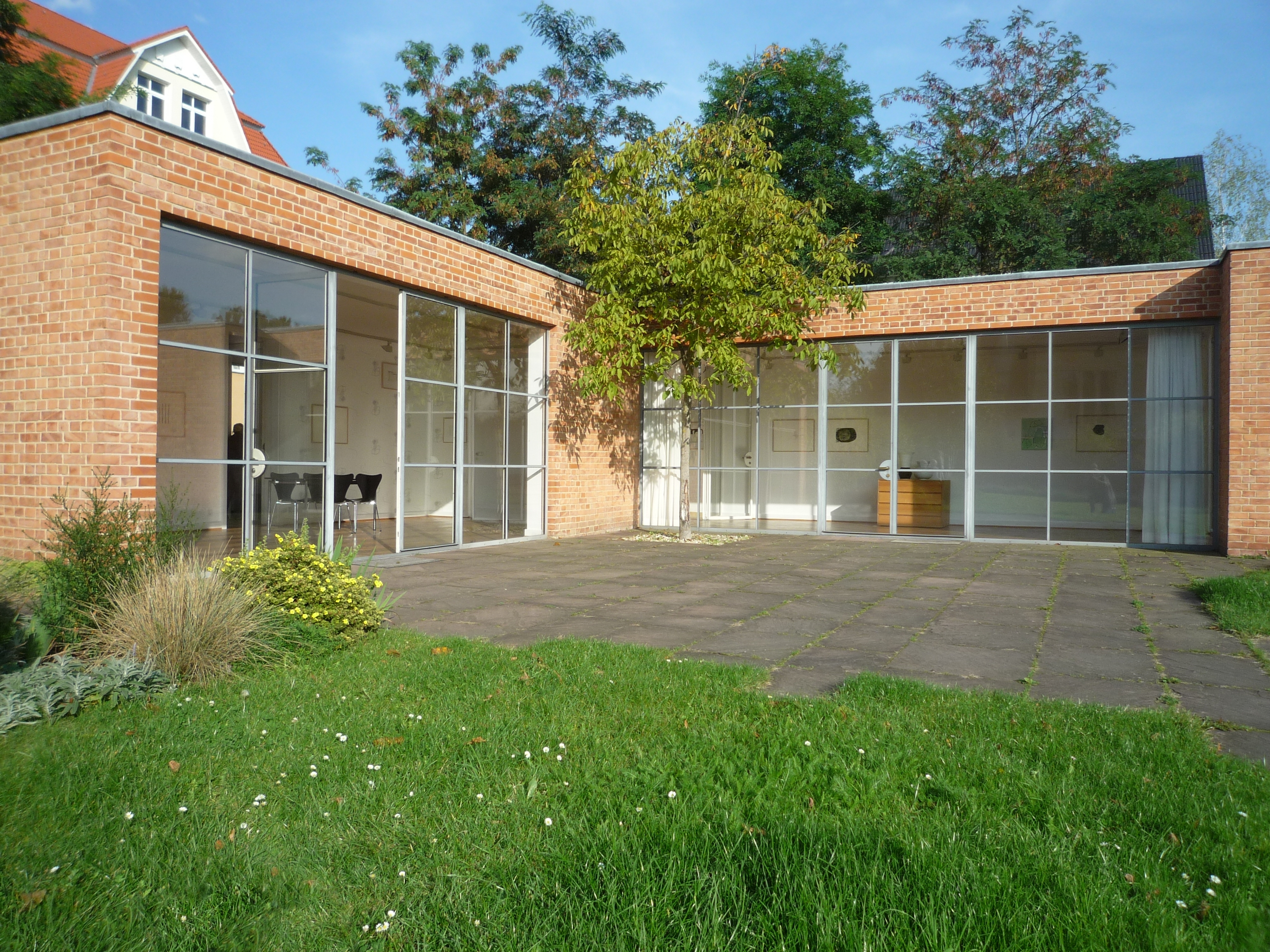
View from southwest

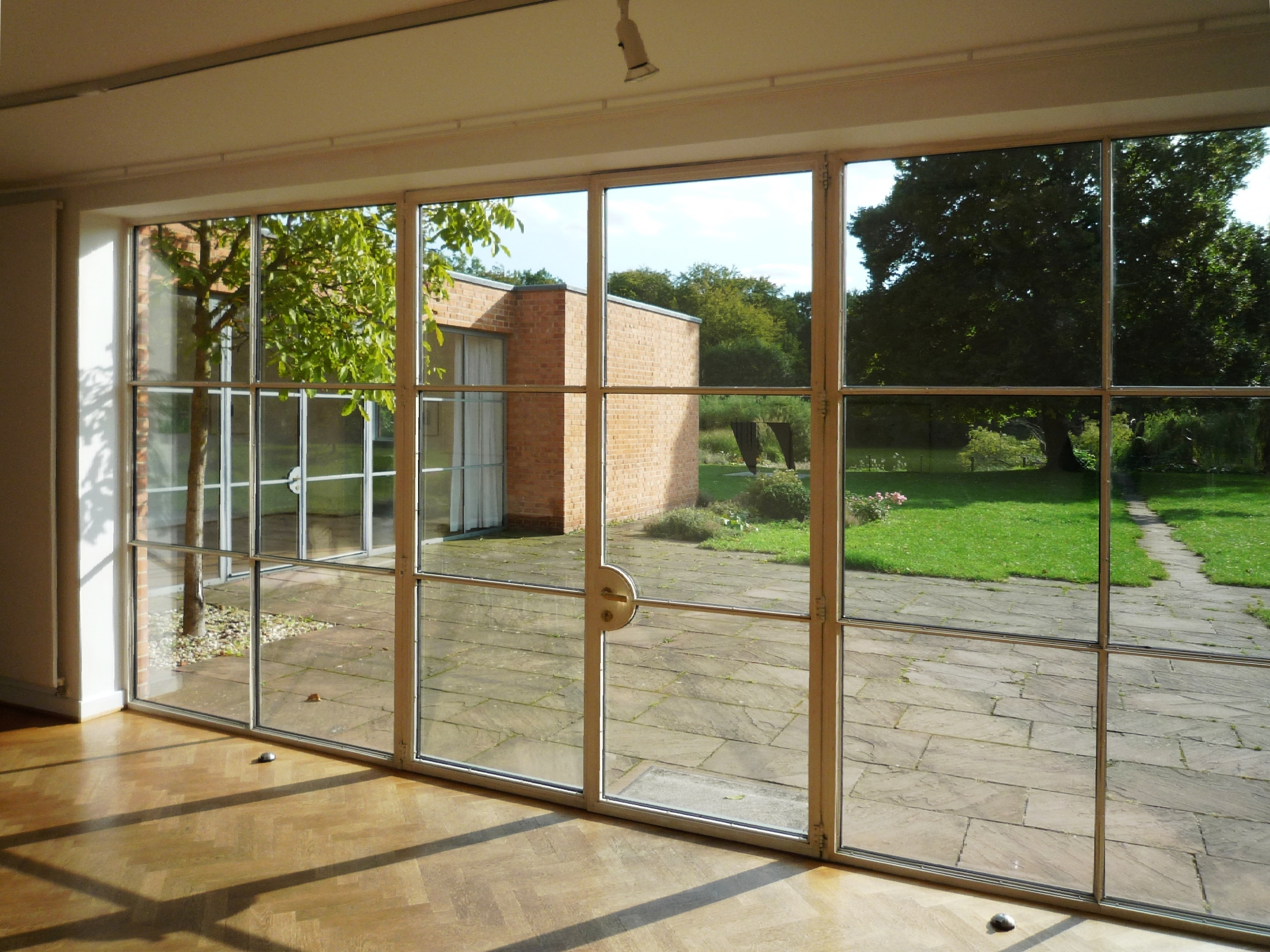
Interior, view to the south
