= Arch Moscow =

Annual architecture and design exhibition in Russia

Coordinates: 55°44′4.37″N 37°36′17.30″E

Arch Moscow is an international exhibition of architecture and design held annually since 1995.

It is held in Moscow, Russia, in the Central House of Artist in the Crimean shaft (Krymsky Val). The organizer is Expo Park Company.
