= Prince Michael Feodorovich of Russia =

French film director (1924–2008)

Michael Feodorovich of Russia
- Prince of Russia
- Prince Michel Feodorovich
- Born: 4 May 1924; Paris, France
- Died: 22 September 2008 (aged 84); Paris, France
- Spouse: Helga Friederike Magda Staufenberger (m. 1958; div. 1992) María de las Mercedes Ustrell Gabani (m. 1994)
- Issue: Prince Michael Mikhailovich Romanovsky
Names
- Michael Feodorovich of Russia
- House: Holstein-Gottorp-Romanov
- Father: Prince Feodor Alexandrovich of Russia
- Mother: Princess Irina Pavlovna Paley

Prince Michael Feodorovich of Russia (French: Michel Romanoff de Russie; 4 May 1924 – 22 September 2008) was a French filmmaker. A descendant of the Russian emperors, he was a grandnephew of the last Russian emperor, Nicholas II.

== Early life ==
Prince Michael Feodorovich was born in the 18th arrondissement of Paris, the only son of Prince Feodor Alexandrovich of Russia and his wife Princess Irina Pavlovna Paley. He descended from the Romanovs through both his father and his mother. Through his father he was a grandson of Grand Duke Alexander Mikhailovich of Russia and his wife Grand Duchess Xenia Alexandrovna of Russia. His mother was a daughter of Grand Duke Paul Alexandrovich of Russia and his second wife Princess Olga Valerianovna Paley, Countess of Hohenfelsen (née Karnovich). Prince Michael Feodorovich was called in France Michel Romanoff de Russie (his civil name in his French identity papers). He was brought up in Paris and Biarritz. As a child he learned to speak French, English and Russian. In his later years he learned Spanish and Catalan.

After the separation of his parents in 1932, Prince Michael Feodorovich went to live with his mother in Neuilly where he attended the École du Montcel school. Following the outbreak of World War II his family moved back to Biarritz. He served in the French infantry between 1945 and 1946 and accompanied the army of General Leclerc into Germany.

== Career ==
For some time he worked for the Societé des Parfums of Lucien Lelong, who had been married to his aunt Princess Natalie Paley. In 1949, Prince Michael Feodorovich moved into the film industry working as an assistant director, later becoming a director of production. He worked, among others, with René Clair, Julien Duvivier and Henri-Georges Clouzot. Burt Lancaster, Tony Curtis, Gina Lollobrigida and Marlon Brando were some of the well-known actors who appeared in his films. In the 1950s the prince had an affair with actress Annabella (1907–1996), after the latter had divorced the American actor Tyrone Power. Their love affair lasted ten years, and despite their age difference the French actress would have liked to marry the prince. They later split, but Michael Feodorovich remained very attached to Annabella until her death.

After retiring from the industry in 1985 he spent his retirement living between Biarritz and Neuilly. After his second marriage he brought a house in L'Escala on the Costa Brava. Prince Michael Feodorovich joined the Romanov Family Association on its creation in 1979.

Prince Michael Feodorovich first visited Russia in 1990. He made another trip in 1994 to attend a book launch with the St Petersburg authorities looking to provide him with a house in return for his help in promoting Russian culture. When asked about the house he said "First the house, then I'll ask for a passport." He made another visit to Russia in 1997 to attend the opening of his Romanov photographic exhibition which was also attended by a number of his cousins. Prince Michael Feodorovich refused to attend with other members of the Imperial family, the burial of his great uncle Nicholas II as he doubted the bones were genuine. He later tried unsuccessfully to prevent the reburial of the remains in St Petersburg of his great-grandmother, the Dowager Empress Maria Feodorovna, as he felt that "members of the Imperial family who died in exile should stay where they passed away".

Prince Michael Feodorovich died in the 18th arrondissement of Paris at the age of 84. His cousin Prince Michael Andreevich of Russia died in Sydney on the same day.

== Marriages and children ==
Prince Michael Feodorovich married firstly in Paris on 15 October 1958 Helga Friederike Magda Staufenberger (Vienna, 22 August 1926 - ?), daughter of Ludwig Staufenberger and his wife Friederike Marie Josepha Schmoll, daughter of the founder of the famous Schmoll company (cleaning products of all kinds). They had one son before divorcing in 1992.

- Prince Michael Paul Mikhailovich Romanoff de Russie (Paris, 31 July 1959 – Mumbai, 24 January 2001), unmarried

After his divorce he was married secondly in Josse on 15 January 1994 to María de las Mercedes Ustrell Cabani (b. L'Hospitalet de Llobregat, 26 August 1960). In 1995 he adopted her natural daughter and his natural paternal granddaughter Tatiana Alexandra Romanova de Russie (b. Bayonne, 21 October 1986), who works with her mother in real estate.

== Filmography as assistant director ==
- 1957 : Pot-Bouille directed by Julien Duvivier
- 1949 : Black Jak directed by Julien Duvivier
- 1961 : Fanny directed by Joshua Logan
- 1951 : Juliette ou la clé des songes directed by Marcel Carné
- 1967 : Diaboliquement vôtre directed by Julien Duvivier
- 1957 : L'Homme à l'imperméable directed by Julien Duvivier
- 1953 : Le retour de Don Camillo directed by Julien Duvivier
- 1955 : Les Diaboliques directed by Henri-Georges Clouzot
- 1959 : Marie-Octobre directed by Julien Duvivier
- 1965 : Le dimanche de la vie directed by Jean Herman
- 1968 : Un soir, un train directed by Jean Delvaux
- 1967 : Les Demoiselles de Rochefort directed by Agnès Varda and Jacques Demy
- 1967 : Trois Chambres à Manhattan directed by Marcel Carné
- 1957 : Les espions directed by Henri-Georges Clouzot
- 1956 : Trapèze directed by Carol Reed
- 1953 : Les Orgueilleux directed by Yves Allégret and Rafael E. Portas
- 1953 : Le Salaire de la peur directed by Henri-Georges Clouzot
- 1956 : Anastasia directed by Anatole Litvak.

== Ancestry ==
Ancestors of Prince Michael Feodorovich of Russia

8. Grand Duke Michael Nikolaevich of Russia
4. Grand Duke Alexander Mikhailovich of Russia
9. Princess Cecilie of Baden
2. Prince Feodor Alexandrovich of Russia
10. Alexander III of Russia
5. Grand Duchess Xenia Alexandrovna of Russia
11. Princess Dagmar of Denmark
1. Prince Michael Feodorovich of Russia
12. Alexander II of Russia
6. Grand Duke Paul Alexandrovich of Russia
13. Princess Marie of Hesse and by Rhine
3. Princess Irina Pavlovna Paley
14. Valerian Gavrilovich Karnovich
7. Olga Valerianovna Karnovich
15. Olga Vasilyevna Meszaros
