= Natalia Pavlovna Paley =

Member of the Romanov family (1905–1981)

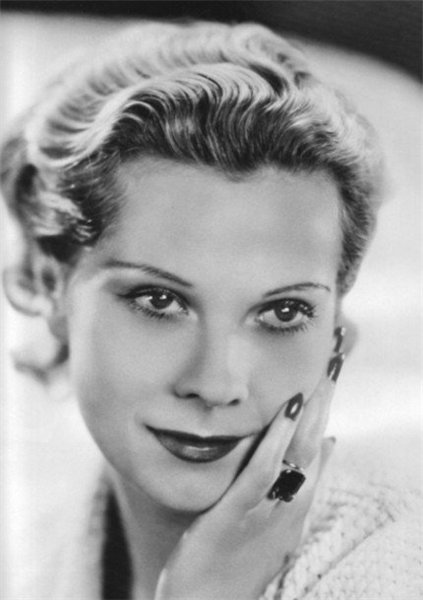
- Born: Countess Natalia Pavlovna von Hohenfelsen; 5 December 1905; Boulogne-Billancourt, Paris, France
- Died: 27 December 1981 (aged 76); New York City, U.S.
- Spouse: Lucien Lelong (m. 1927; div. 1937) John C. Wilson (m. 1937; died 1961)
- Father: Grand Duke Paul Alexandrovich of Russia
- Mother: Olga Valerianovna Karnovich
- Occupation: Actress, model, socialite

Princess Natalia Pavlovna Paley (Russian: Наталья Павловна Палей; 5 December 1905 – 27 December 1981) was a Russian aristocrat who was a non-dynastic member of the Romanov family. A daughter of Grand Duke Paul Alexandrovich of Russia, she was a first cousin of the last Russian emperor, Nicholas II. After the Russian Revolution, she emigrated first to France and later to the United States. She became a fashion model, socialite, vendeuse, and briefly pursued a career as a film actress.

== Early life ==
She was born as Countess Natalia Pavlovna von Hohenfelsen at her parents' home, 2 Avenue Victor Hugo (now 4 Avenue Robert Schuman), in Boulogne-sur-Seine, close to Paris, France, on 5 December 1905. She was the youngest child of Grand Duke Paul Alexandrovich of Russia and his morganatic second wife, Olga Valerianovna Karnovich, who was of Hungarian descent.

Her parents had met in St. Petersburg in 1895 when Olga Karnovich was married to an officer, by whom she had three children. Grand Duke Paul already was the father of two; his first wife, Princess Alexandra of Greece, had died in childbirth. On 9 January 1897, Olga gave birth to a son, Vladimir, by Grand Duke Paul. Olga was granted a divorce from her husband and soon left Russia to marry Paul in Livorno, Italy, on 10 October 1902. Grand Duke Paul and Olga were still vacationing in Rome when they were forbidden to return to Russia by Paul's nephew, the reigning Tsar Nicholas II. Their daughter Irina was born on 21 December 1903. In 1904, Grand Duke Paul arranged through Luitpold, Prince Regent of Bavaria for his wife and their children to be granted the hereditary title of Count/Countess von Hohenfelsen, with a coat of arms. They settled in Paris and bought a house in Boulogne-sur-Seine that previously belonged to Princess Zinaida Yusupova. It was there that Natalia was born in 1905, completing their family. Paul and Olga employed a household staff of sixteen maids, gardeners, cooks, and tutors, and were avid art and old porcelain collectors. Vladimir, Irina, and Natalia had a happy and privileged upbringing and, for a time, were utterly protected from the outside world. Though their parents had a busy social life, the children were very close to them, and they ate their meals together, an unusual custom for children of their time and station. On Sundays, the whole family would enter the Alexander Nevsky Cathedral on Rue Daru, but they would only attend private mass with the priest who had christened Natalia.

== Life in Russia ==
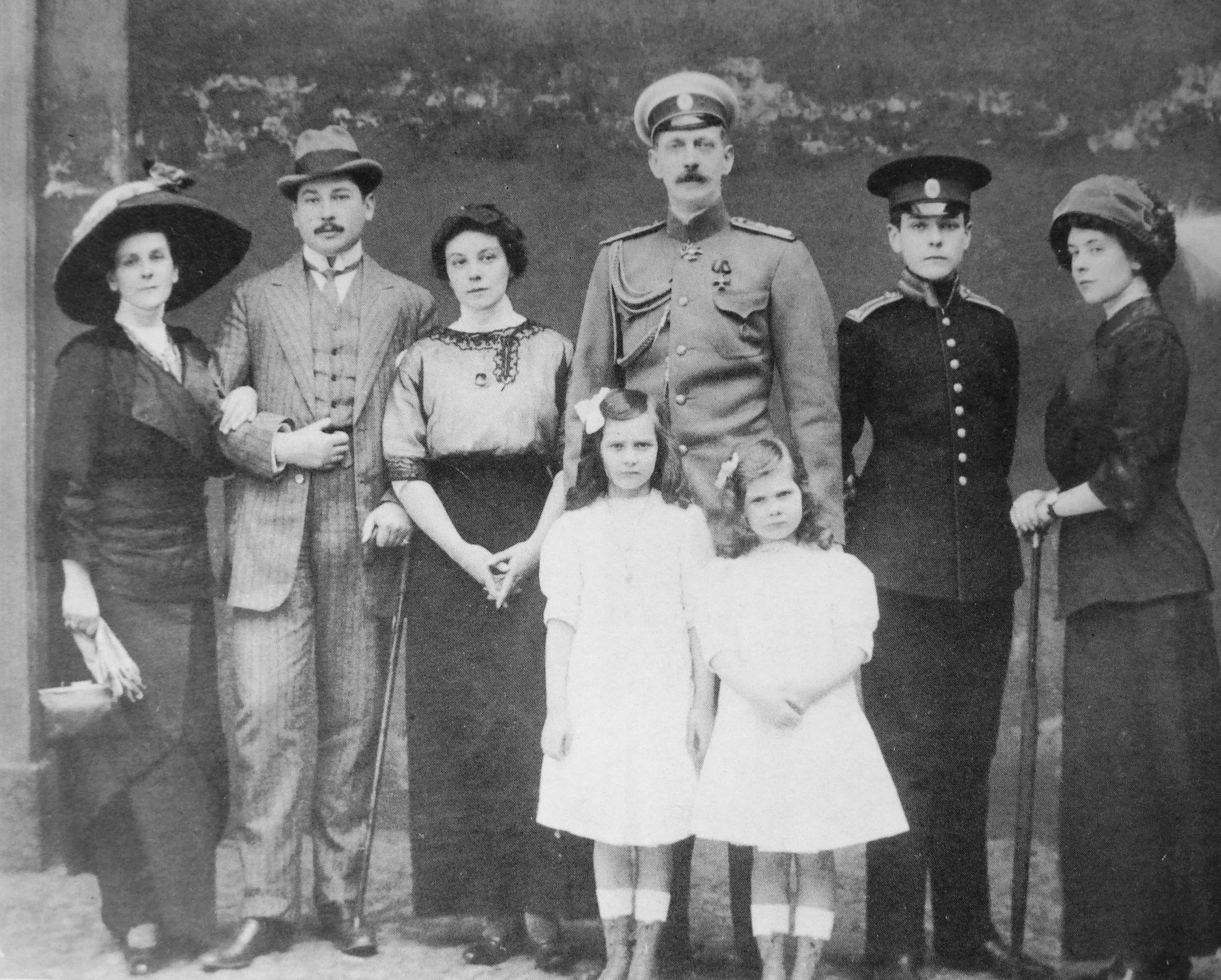
From left to right: Princess Olga Paley, her eldest son Alexander Erikovich von Pistohlkors, Olga Erikovna von Pistohlkors, Grand Duke Paul Alexandrovich of Russia, Princess Irina Paley, Princess Natalia Paley, Prince Vladimir Paley, and Marianne Pistohlkors.

In January 1912, Tsar Nicholas II forgave his only living uncle for marrying morganatically, and Grand Duke Paul returned to Russia on the occasion of the Romanov Tercentenary. He was followed later by his wife and their three children. In May 1914, the family settled in Tsarskoe Selo in a luxurious palace filled with antiques and objects of art. In Russia, Natalia became close to her maternal grandmother, her half-sisters, and half-brothers. Three months after they had settled into their new life, World War I began.

During the war, the German title of Count/Countess von Hohenfelsen was deemed inappropriate due to anti German sentiment, so in August 1915, Nicholas II created the title of Prince/Princess Paley. This was the name by which Natalia, her full siblings, and their mother would be known from then on. The same month, Natalia's brother, Prince Vladimir Paley, joined a regiment. Though he was in poor health, Natalia's father, Grand Duke Paul, ignoring his doctor's advice, left to take command of a Guards regiment in 1916.

As a child, Natalia was gay and animated, described as having a turned-up nose, pink cheeks and beautiful blonde curls. Her childhood was described by her older half-sister in her memoirs:

"The girls revered their brother and greatly admired him. Volodia took advantage of this to make them carry out all his desires. In rehearsing them in the plays he wrote he worked them mercilessly for hours on end. Highly flattered by his attention his sisters endured patiently all his rudeness, his scoldings, even his slaps. He often made them cry, yet they always took up a new play with the same enthusiasm and did not in the least appreciate it when I or some other grown-up tried to protect them from Volodia's arbitrary tyranny."

At the fall of the Russian monarchy in February 1917, instead of leaving the country, Grand Duke Paul and his wife, not seeing the dangers ahead, decided to stay in their luxurious estate amid the upheaval. As Tsar Nicholas II and his family were sent to internal exile in Siberia, Natalia and her family remained in their palace under increasingly deteriorating conditions after the Bolshevik rise to power in October 1917. By early January 1918, they could no longer afford to heat their large Tsarkoe Selo palace, and they were forced to move to an English dacha at Tsarkoe Selo that belonged to Grand Duke Boris Vladimirovich. Their former home was expropriated and turned into a museum, while Lenin himself rode in their car.

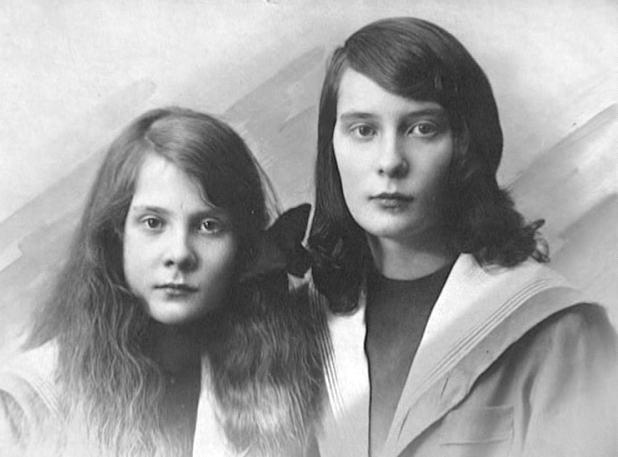
Princesses Natalia and Irina Paley

In March 1918, the revolution tightened its grip. All male members of the Romanov family, including Natalia's brother Vladimir, were ordered to register at Cheka headquarters, and shortly after they were sent away into internal Russian exile. They never saw Vladimir again. He was executed by the Bolsheviks, along with several other Romanovs relatives, on 18 July 1918, one day after the murder of Tsar Nicholas II and his immediate family at Yekaterinburg. Grand Duke Paul, who was too ill to travel, initially escaped the fate of his son. He was arrested on 30 July and sent to Spalernaia prison, where he would remain for most of his incarceration. In desperation, Olga left her two youngest daughters, Irina and Natalia, aged 14 and 12, under the care of their English governess, moving with her daughter Marianne Pistohlkors to be closer to her husband's prison. Irina and Natalia, accompanied by their governess, were allowed to pay two visits to their father. The sisters lived alone with the servants until October, when Grand Duke Boris's dacha was expropriated, and the sisters were evicted.

Natalia and Irina were forced to move to Petrograd with their mother and their half-sister, Marianne. Worried about her daughters, Olga, with the help of a few remaining friends, organized Irina and Natalia' escape. In early December, the girls left their mother and took a streetcar to the train station of Ochta. After a four-hour trip in a cattle wagon, they jumped into the snow and took a horse-drawn sleigh. Finally, they walked for miles in the frigid night air. After thirty-two hours of traveling, they reached Terijoki, the Finnish frontier. On arriving there, they continued their journey to Vyborg. Taken to a sanatorium in Ranha, they anxiously awaited their parents' arrival. Their father never made it. Grand Duke Paul was killed in January 1919 and tossed into a heap along with the bodies of other victims. The following month, Princess Olga joined her daughters in Finland.

== Life in France ==
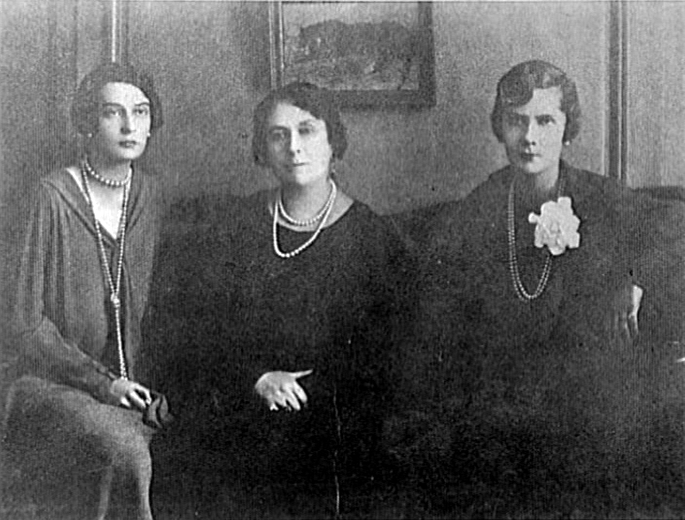
Princesses Irina, Olga and Natalia Paley

Once in exile, Princess Paley and her daughters moved to Sweden, where they stayed until the spring of 1920. They eventually settled in exile in France. They sold their townhouse at Boulogne-sur-Seine and bought another in one of the upper-class neighborhoods of Paris in the 16th district. With her few remaining jewels, Princess Olga bought a villa in Biarritz, on the Atlantic coast, where the family would often gather in the future. Later, she would sell her house and buy a smaller one in Neuilly. Princess Natalia and her sister were sent to a boarding school in Switzerland, but Natalia was unable to mix with the other pupils. As she confessed later in a fashion magazine interview, she felt,

...so different from the others. At twelve, French girls were still reading Robinson Crusoe and watching Douglas Fairbanks movies. At twelve, I was taking some bread to my father in jail. How could I have been like them? I was mute, I would not play. But I was reading a lot. I had faced death, so close. My father, my brother, my cousins, my uncles, executed, all Romanov's blood splashed on my adolescence. This gave me a taste for sad things, poetry, the icy and lightning antechamber of death. Soon, my classmates understood me. And respected the way I was, as strange as it may have seemed.

The sisters came back to Paris, where Irina married Prince Feodor Alexandrovich of Russia, a nephew of Tsar Nicholas II, on 31 May 1923.

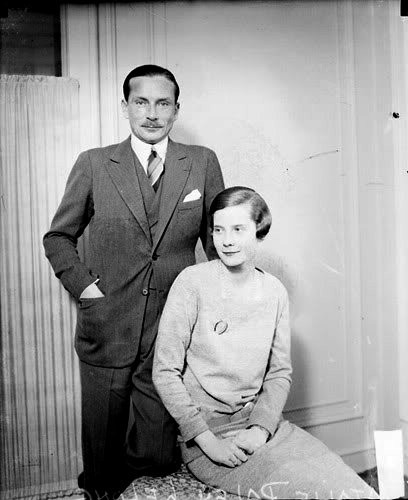
Natalia Paley with her first husband, Lucien Lelong

During one of the Charity Bazaars her mother gave every year, Princess Natalia, age 21, met Lucien Lelong, a prominent French couturier who offered her a job in his fashion house. She began to work initially in the perfume department, moving soon to model the house's designs. Lelong had inherited his famous fashion house from his father. A hero of World War I, he was then married and the father of a little girl. With her aristocratic background and her delicate features, Natalia was an asset for Lelong's business. Lucien Lelong divorced his wife, Anne-Marie Audoy, on 16 July 1927. Lelong was known for his homosexual affairs, but he offered her wealth and security. Against her family's opinion, who considered the union a misalliance, Princess Natalia and Lucien Lelong married in a civil ceremony on 9 August 1927. A religious ceremony took place the next day at the Alexander Nevsky Cathedral, Paris. Theirs was a white marriage, a union without intimacy.

Lelong's reputation grew with the help of his wife, whose taste was exquisite. Ethereal and glamorous, Princess Natalia would not follow any fashion trend, but would dictate her own. Hats and gloves were her signature. With deep-set gray eyes and pale blond hair, she became a sought-after model, establishing an image for herself in the Parisian elite and becoming a well-known socialite. As a model, she appeared in many magazines, including Vogue. She was a favorite model for the great photographers of her time: Edward Steichen, Cecil Beaton, Horst P. Horst, André Durst and George Hoyningen-Huene.

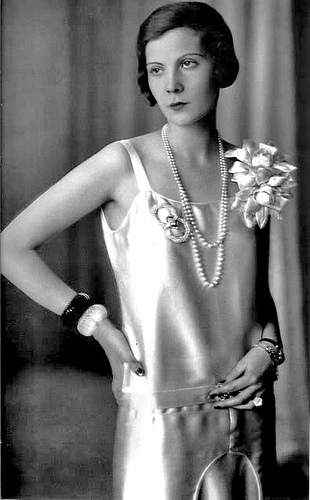
Natalia Paley worked as a model during the late 1920s and early 1930s

Though they shared the same infatuation for the arts and fashion, the marriage of Princess Natalia and Lelong was not a success. Too involved with his work and in love with one of his famous models who was doomed to die of tuberculosis, Lelong never grew to understand his wife's languor, or her frequent outbursts of temper when she was out of the limelight. On her part, Natalia began a two-year affair with dancer Serge Lifar. Their relationship ended when she began a passionate but platonic relationship with Jean Cocteau, who, like Lifar and most men she was attracted to, was homosexual. Cocteau wanted to marry her and have a child with her, but Princess Natalia declined the offer. Their affair ended in the fall of 1932.

She bought an apartment on the Esplanade des Invalides, where she entertained society and prominent artists. She continued to work as a photographic model in connection with Lelong's fashion house. In the spring of 1933, she began to pursue a film career and studied acting with Belgian actress Eve Francis, the former wife of director Louis Delluc.

Her first film was L'epervier (1933), directed by Marcel L'Herbier, her husband's cousin. It was the beginning of her career as a movie actress, taking parts in several European movies, including Sir Alexander Korda's The Private Life of Don Juan (1934). She eventually moved to the United States, where she had a small role in George Cukor's Sylvia Scarlett (1935), a film starring Katharine Hepburn, who became a lifelong friend. Princess Paley's acting skills were modest. Her name and her beauty were her main assets, and her film career never took off. In 1936, she returned briefly to France to film The New Men (Les Hommes nouveaux) with Jean Marais, under the direction of Marcel L'Herbier. Les Hommes nouveaux was a success in Europe, but marked the end of Princess Paley's acting career.

== Life in the United States ==
Natalia Paley with her second husband, John C. Wilson

Upon her return to the United States, Princess Natalia settled permanently in New York City. There, she met John C. "Jack" Wilson, a theater producer and director, who had previously been the lover of Noël Coward. After divorcing Lelong on 24 May 1937, Princess Natalia married Wilson on 8 September 1937 in Fairfield, Connecticut. It was a marriage of convenience. Wilson was intelligent, rich and a good companion. Princess Natalia's name and social skills were assets to his business as a Broadway producer. Princess Natalia liked her husband's humor, and his homosexuality suited her distaste for physical love. The couple, who would not have children, settled in an apartment in Manhattan overlooking Central Park. They traveled extensively: Saint Moritz, London, and Venice were favorite vacation spots.

World War II affected Princess Natalia only because her family and friends were living abroad. Though she went back to France in 1947, she spaced out her trips to Europe and spent more time in her luxurious residence, an apartment on East 57th Street in Manhattan. Later, she moved to another one on Park Avenue. She also had a cottage in Montego Bay, Jamaica, and a large property in Fairfield, Connecticut.

On 5 February 1941, Princess Natalia became a naturalized American citizen. She was a well-known socialite in New York City and was popular at fashionable events for her beauty and glamor. For many years, Princess Natalia worked in public relations as a promoter of the fashion house Mainbocher. She was a friend of Elsa Maxwell and became a confidante of Antoine de Saint-Exupéry. In the 1940s and early 1950s, Princess Natalia had a lengthy romantic relationship with writer Erich Maria Remarque, who fictionalized her as "Natascha" in his posthumous novel, Shadows in Paradise.

During the 1950s, Wilson's career declined. He was a heavy drinker and became mentally imbalanced. Natalia tried to help him, but he was self-destructive. Unable to walk, often violent, and in a state of increasing dementia, he died in November 1961, at age 62.

== Final years ==
After the death of her husband, Princess Natalia withdrew from society. In the last two decades of her life, she lived as a recluse, surrounded by her pets in her Manhattan apartment. Her only hobbies were watching television and crosswords. She developed diabetes and progressively lost her vision. Her blindness isolated her further. Letters and phone calls to her sister Irina were rare. In the 1970s, her nephew, Prince Micheal Feodorovich Romanov, tried to visit her at her Manhattan apartment but she declined to see him, apparently to prevent him from seeing her sad condition.

In December 1981, Princess Natalia suffered a fall in her bathroom. Doctors diagnosed a fracture of the femoral neck. She was transported to Roosevelt Hospital where, against the advice of her last two friends who feared a fatal outcome, surgeons decided to operate on the same night. Princess Natalia died at dawn on 27 December 1981, at Roosevelt Hospital in New York. She was buried in the churchyard of the First Presbyterian Church in Ewing, New Jersey.

== Ancestry ==
Ancestors of Natalia Pavlovna Paley

8. Nicholas I of Russia
4. Alexander II of Russia
9. Princess Charlotte of Prussia
2. Grand Duke Paul Alexandrovich of Russia
10. Louis II, Grand Duke of Hesse and by Rhine
5. Princess Marie of Hesse and by Rhine
11. Princess Wilhelmine of Baden
1. Princess Natalia Pavlovna Paley
12. Gavriil Stepanovich Karnovich
6. Valerian Gavrilovich Karnovich
13. Lyubov Alexeevna Goryainov
3. Olga Valerianovna Karnovich
7. Olga Vasilyevna Meszaros

== Filmography ==
- L'Épervier (1933)
- Prince Jean (1934)
- The Private Life of Don Juan (1934)
- Sylvia Scarlett (1935; uncredited)
- The New Men (1936)
- Folies Bergère (1936)

== Bibliography ==
- Coudert, Thierry. Cafe Society: Socialites, Patrons, and Artists 1920-1960. Flammarion, 2010. ISBN 2080301578
- Hall, Coryne. The English Dacha at Tsarkoe Selo. Royalty Digest Quarterly. 2007 N 1.
- Hilton, Tims. Erich Maria Remarque: The Last Romantic, Da Capo Press, 2004.
- Mitterrand, Frédéric. Mémoires d'exil . Paris, Robert Laffont, 1999. ISBN 2-221-09023-3
- Vassiliev, Alexandre. Beauty in Exile: The Artists, Models, and Nobility who Fled the Russian Revolution and Influenced the World of Fashion. Harry N. Abrams, 2001. ISBN 0-8109-5701-9
- Willis, Daniel. The Romanovs in the 21st Century: a genealogical Biography. VDM, 2009. ISBN 978-3-639-17480-9.
