= Mészáros =

Meszaros (Slavicized as Mesaros), Mészáros, and Mesaroš are Hungarian occupational surnames, meaning "slaughterer".

- Andrej Meszároš (born 1985), Slovak hockey player
- Dániel Mészáros (born 2004), Hungarian swimmer
- Erika Mészáros (born 1966), Hungarian sprint canoer
- Ferenc Mészáros (disambiguation)
- István Mészáros (disambiguation)
- Johann Mészáros von Szoboszló (1737–1801), Austro-Hungarian general
- Karol Mészáros (born 1993), Slovak footballer
- Karola Mészáros, American mathematician
- Krisztofer Mészáros (born 2001), Hungarian artistic gymnast
- Lázár Mészáros (1796–1858), Hungarian Minister of War
- Lőrinc Mészáros (born 1966), Hungarian businessman and billionaire
- Márta Mészáros (born 1931), Hungarian screenwriter/film director
- Michael Meszaros, Australian sculptor and medallist
- Mike Mesaros, bass and vocalist of The Smithereens
- Michu Meszaros (1939–2016), Hungarian performer
- Mihalj Mesaroš (1935–2017), Yugoslav/Serbian footballer
- Norbert Mészáros (born 1980), Hungarian footballer
- Peter Mészáros (born 1943), Hungarian-American physicist

== Mesaroș ==
- Alexandru Mesian (né Mesaroș; 1937–2023), Bishop of Lugoj
- Serghei Mesaroș (born 1953), Romanian former politician (deputy in the 1990–1992 legislature)

== See also ==
- Mészáros effect
