= Karnovich =

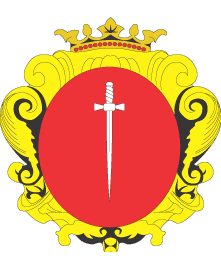
Coat of Arms of the Karnovich family

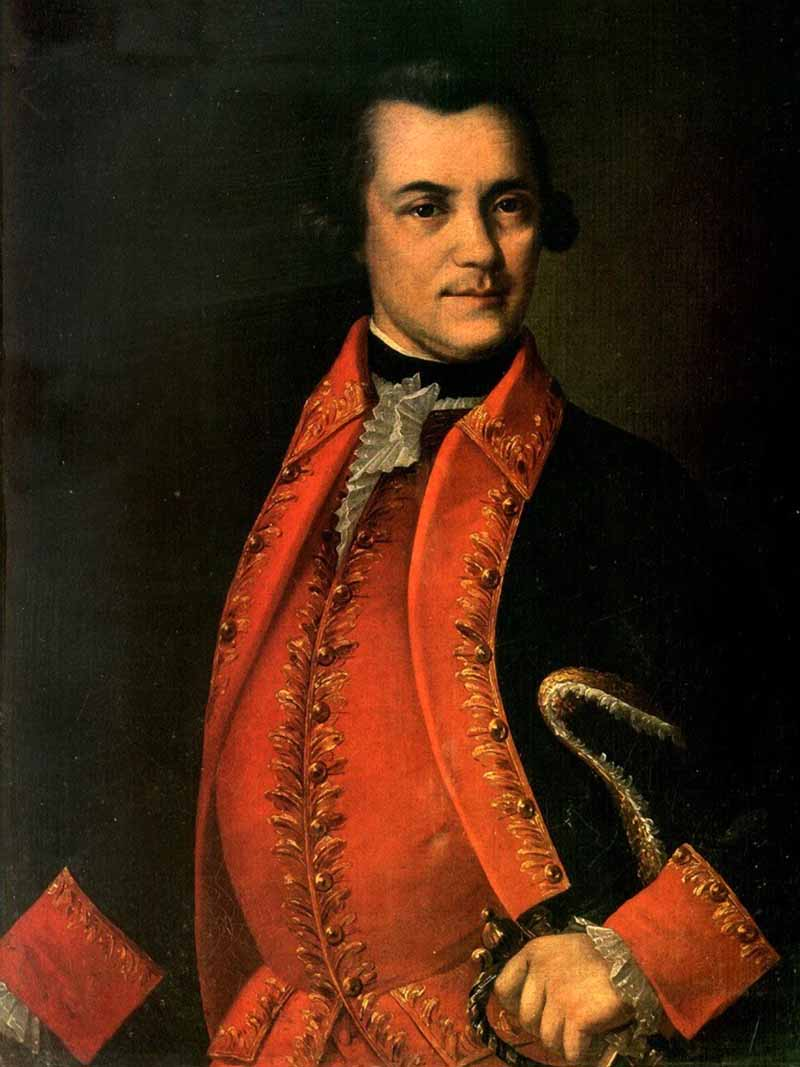
Major general Stepan Efimovich Karnovich (1707–1788)

The Karnovich family (Russian: Карнович) was an old Russian noble family of Hungarian and German origin. They were included in the VI part of the genealogical book of the Yaroslav, Kursk, Chernigov and Tula provinces, as determined by the Governing Senate (dated October 11, 1860 and April 16, 1863).

== History ==
The Karnovich family got its name from the city of Karnov, whose owners in 1440 ceded their princely rights to the Margraves of Brandenburg for 14,000 silver marks, and moved themselves to the Kingdom of Hungary with the family name of Karnovich. In 1543, during the marriage of the Polish prince (later Sigismund II Augustus ) with Elizabeth, daughter of King Ferdinand of Hungary, Peter Berstein-Karnovich, a Hungarian nobleman, was called up to Polish service and was granted villages in return for his loyal service. The family consisted of several branches, with the most notable being the Yaroslav branch.

== Yaroslav branch ==
The history of the Yaroslavl branch of the Karnovich family starts with Stepan Efimovich Karnovich (1707–1788), who was, in 1756, listed as a valet at the court of the heir to the Russian throne. In 1761, he became Major general in the Russian Imperial Army, and, as a favorite of Emperor Peter III, he was awarded the title of Count in the Duchy of Schleswig-Holstein-Gottorp, but neither he nor his descendants later sought further formal acknowledgement of this title. S.E. Karnovich already owned 345 peasant households in Little Russia, when on March 13, 1762, Emperor Peter III granted him the palace and an estate in the Yaroslavl province, consisting of 3 bigger villages and 19 smaller ones.

Evgeny Karnovich (1823–1885), Stepan's great-grandson distinguished himself as a noted Russian writer, historian, journalist and editor.

On the other hand, Stepan's great-great-granddaughter, Olga Karnovich (1865–1929), became famous Russian socialite and a morganatic second wife of Grand Duke Paul Alexandrovich of Russia. In 1915, she was awarded with the hereditary title Princess Paley, in the Russian Empire, by her husband's nephew, Nicholas II, Emperor of Russia. In 1916, an Imperial decree approved the decision of the Yaroslavl Assembly of Nobles to include Sergei Valerianovich Karnovich (1853–1918) and his sister Olga in the Karnovich family genealogy chart, confirming their nobility birth right. Their sister, Lyubov Valerianovna Golovina (b. 1851 – died after 1920) was a friend of Fyodor Mikhailovich Dostoevsky.

== Notable people ==
- Stepan Efimovich Karnovich (1707–1788), Major General in the Russian Imperial Army, Count in the Duchy of Holstein-Gottorp
- Evgeny Karnovich (1823–1885), Russian writer, historian, journalist and editor.
- Olga Karnovich (1865–1929), later Princess Paley, morganatic second wife of Grand Duke Paul Alexandrovich of Russia
