= Irina Paley =

Daughter of Grand Duke Paul Alexandrovich of Russia

Princess Irina Pavlovna Paley
- Princess Feodor Alexandrovich of Russia; Countess Hubert de Monbrison
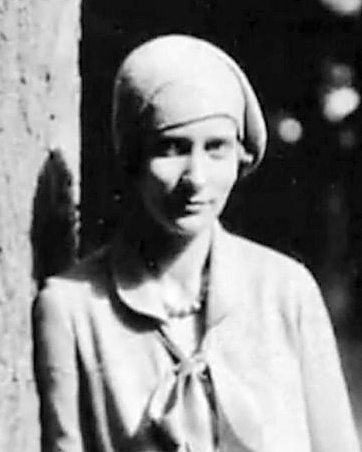
- Born: 21 December 1903; Paris, France
- Died: 15 November 1990 (aged 86); Paris, France
- Spouse: Prince Feodor Alexandrovich of Russia (m. 1923; div. 1936) Count Hubert de Monbrison (m. 1950; died 1981)
- Issue: Prince Michael Feodorovich of Russia; Princess Irene Feodorovona
- Father: Grand Duke Paul Alexandrovich of Russia
- Mother: Olga Valerianovna Karnovich

Princess Irina Pavlovna Paley (21 December 1903 – 15 November 1990) was the daughter of Grand Duke Paul Alexandrovich of Russia and his second wife, Olga Valerianovna Karnovich.

== Early life ==
Irina was born in Paris because her parents had been exiled for marrying without the permission of Tsar Nicholas II. Her parents' marriage was considered morganatic, meaning that her father had not married a woman of equal rank, and their children took their mother's rank rather than their father's. Irina's mother was later granted the title of Princess Paley by Tsar Nicholas II. The family was allowed to return to Russia during World War I. Her older half-sister Maria was supposed to be her godmother, but their uncle Grand Duke Sergei, who had been appointed as Maria's guardian, forbade it.

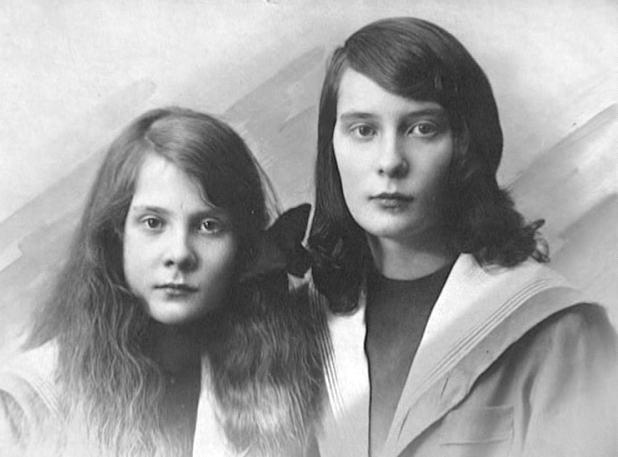
Princesses Irina (right) and Natalia Paley

As a child, Irina resembled her father, being thin, pensive and impressionable. Her childhood was described by her older half-sister in her memoirs:

"The girls revered their brother and greatly admired him. Volodia took advantage of this to make them carry out all his desires. In rehearsing them in the plays he wrote he worked them mercilessly for hours on end. Highly flattered by his attention his sisters endured patiently all his rudeness, his scoldings, even his slaps. He often made them cry, yet they always took up a new play with the same enthusiasm and did not in the least appreciate it when I or some other grown-up tried to protect them from Volodia's arbitrary tyranny."

Following the Russian Revolution of 1917, Grand Duke Paul, who was too ill to register with the rest of the Romanov family, was under close observation by the new government. Irina later recalled how her father walked with her and her younger sister in the garden and talked about what his marriage had meant to him:

"He spoke to us at length about all that he owed to our mother, all that she had brought to him which he had never known in his life before, and about all that she had been to him. He spoke while he walked, and this allowed him to overcome his reserve and his intense shyness. Did he sense then that he had not long to live? I am tempted to believe it and to think that he was asking us to take care of our mother when he could no longer be with her."

Both Irina's father and her brother, Vladimir Pavlovich Paley, were killed by the Bolsheviks. Irina, her mother, and her sister Natalia later escaped to France in 1920.

== Marriages ==
Irina married her first cousin once removed, Prince Feodor Alexandrovich of Russia (1898–1968), son of Grand Duke Alexander Mikhailovich and Grand Duchess Xenia Alexandrovna (sister of Nicholas II), on 21 May 1923 in Paris. They later had a son, Prince Michael Feodorovich of Russia, on 4 May 1924.

She began an affair with Count Hubert de Monbrison (15 August 1892 – 14 April 1981) during her marriage to Feodor and bore Hubert a daughter, Irene Romanov, on 7 May 1934, while still married to Feodor. She and Feodor were divorced on 22 July 1936. Irina married Hubert on 11 April 1950 in Paris.

Irina died in Paris on 15 November 1990. She was the last surviving grandchild of Alexander II of Russia. Her son and daughter both have descendants.

== Ancestry ==
Ancestors of Irina Paley

8. Nicholas I of Russia
4. Alexander II of Russia
9. Princess Charlotte of Prussia
2. Grand Duke Paul Alexandrovich of Russia
10. Louis II, Grand Duke of Hesse and by Rhine
5. Princess Marie of Hesse and by Rhine
11. Princess Wilhelmine of Baden
1. Princess Irina Pavlovna Paley
6. Valerian Karnovich
3. Olga Valerianovna Karnovich
7. Olga Vasilyevna Meszaros
