= Prince Feodor Alexandrovich of Russia =

Russian prince (1898–1968)

Prince Feodor Alexandrovich
- Prince of the Imperial Blood
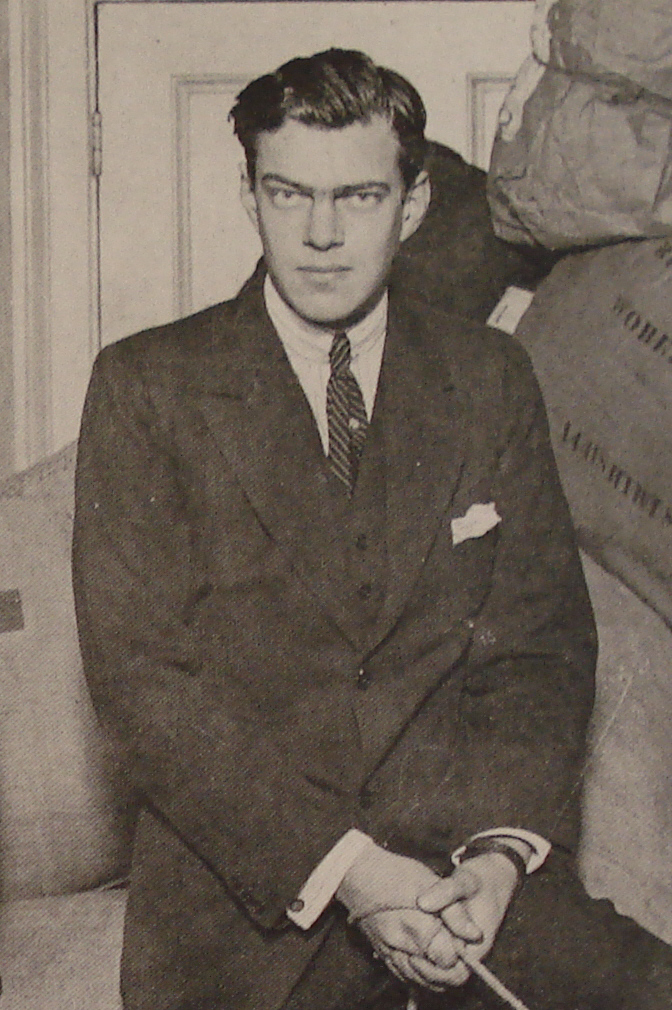
- Prince Theodore Alexandrovich in 1919
- Born: 23 December 1898; Winter Palace, Saint Petersburg, Russian Empire
- Died: 30 November 1968 (aged 69); Ascain, France
- Spouse: Princess Irina Pavlovna Paley (m. 1923; div. 1936)
- Issue: Prince Michael Feodorovich; Princess Irene Feodorovna
- House: Holstein-Gottorp-Romanov
- Father: Grand Duke Alexander Mikhailovich of Russia
- Mother: Grand Duchess Xenia Alexandrovna of Russia

Prince Feodore Alexandrovich of Russia (Russian: Фёдор Александрович Романов; 23 December [O.S. 11 December] 1898 – 30 November 1968) was the second son and third child of Grand Duke Alexander Mikhailovich of Russia and Grand Duchess Xenia Alexandrovna. He was also a nephew of Nicholas II of Russia, the last emperor of Russia.

Born and raised in Imperial Russia during the reign of his uncle Nicholas II, he followed a military career and entered the Corps of Pages during World War I. With the fall of the Russian monarchy, he escaped the fate of many of his relatives killed by the Bolsheviks fleeing to his parents estate in Crimea. For a time, he was under house arrest there with a large group of family members. They left Russia on 11 April 1919. In exile, he settled in France where he married Princess Irina Pavlovna Paley, his distant cousin. The couple divorced in 1936. Affected by tuberculosis, Prince Feodor moved to England with his mother spending the years of World War II there. After the war ended, he settled permanently in the south of France.

== Russian prince ==
Prince Feodor Alexandrovich Romanov was born at the Winter Palace in Saint Petersburg, Russian Empire on 23 December 1898. He was the second son and third child among seven siblings. Although a grandson of Emperor Alexander III through his mother, he was not entitled to the title Grand Duke of Russia because he was only a great-grandson of Emperor Nicholas I in the male line through his father. He spent his early years in Imperial Russia. Following family tradition, he began a military career. During World War I he entered the Corps of Pages.

In 1914, his only sister Irina married the controversial Felix Yusupov, who would later murder Rasputin. In his memoirs, Yusupov described his brother-in-law:

"Prince Theodore in particular was very hostile to me. This fifteen-year-old boy was tall for his age; his wild and curly chestnut hair framed a handsome, typically nordic face with very mobile features. His expression could be as ferocious as a wild beast's, or as gentle as a child's. He had a keen sense of humor and an unexpected turn of mind. The hostility which he'd shown me at first soon turned into a deep and lasting friendship. When I married his sister, he made his home with us."

His mother Xenia also wrote: "We went to a Te Deum for the engagement. Luckily Feodor did come. I was so afraid he wouldn't show up! But what an expression on his face. It made me want to cry." At the fall of the Russian monarchy, he looked for refuge with his family in his father's property in Crimea. They lived there undisturbed until the rise to power of the Bolsheviks with the October Revolution in 1917. For some time, Prince Feodor was under house arrest in Ai-Todor and later at Dulber imprisoned with his parents, siblings, grandmother the Dowager Empress and many more Romanov relatives.

Prince Feodor, and his relatives in the Crimea, escaped the fate of a number of his Romanov cousins who were murdered by the Bolsheviks when they were freed by German troops in 1918. He left Russia on 11 April 1919 abroad the Royal Navy ship HMS Marlborough and moved to England and later to France.

== Life in exile ==
During his first years in exile, Prince Feodor lived in Paris in the apartment of his sister Princess Irina Alexandrovna of Russia and her husband Prince Felix Yusupov. He worked as a taxi driver, and later as an architect.

Prince Feodor married on 3 June 1923 in St. Alexander Nevsky Cathedral in Paris, Princess Irina Paley (1903–1990), his first cousin once removed. She was a daughter of Grand Duke Paul Alexandrovich of Russia and his morganatic wife Princess Olga Paley. The couple had one son:

- Prince Michael Feodorovich (Paris 4 May 1924 – 22 September 2008); married 1st Paris 15 October 1958 (divorced 1992) Helga Staufenberger (born Vienna, 22 August 1926); m. 2nd Josse 15 January 1994 Maria de las Mercedes Ustrell-Cabani (b. Hospitalet, Spain 26 August 1960). Michael died on the same day as his cousin, Prince Michael Andreevich of Russia.

Prince Feodor and his wife lived separated in 1930. Princess Irina began a relationship with Count Hubert de Monbrison (15 August 1892 – 14 April 1981) and had a daughter with him while still married to Prince Feodor, who recognized the child as his.

Prince Feodor Alexandrovich and Princess Irina divorced on 22 July 1936. He did not remarry and spent World War II in England at the home of his mother. By 1941 he was seriously ill with tuberculosis and had to stay for long periods in sanatoriums to recuperate. During the war years, he had sporadic contact with his son who remained in the south of France with Feodor's ex-wife. After the war ended, to improve his health and to stay closer to his son, Prince Feodor settled in the south of France at the villa of his sister Princess Irina Alexandrovna. He lived there for the rest of his life. With very limited income of his own and too ill to work, his ex-wife and his sister helped with the medical bills. Prince Feodor Alexandrovich died on 30 November 1968 in Ascain, France.

== Ancestry ==
Ancestors of Prince Feodor Alexandrovich of Russia

8. Nicholas I of Russia
4. Grand Duke Michael Nikolaevich of Russia
9. Princess Charlotte of Prussia
2. Grand Duke Alexander Mikhailovich of Russia
10. Leopold I, Grand Duke of Baden
5. Princess Cecilie of Baden
11. Princess Sofia of Sweden
1. Prince Feodor Alexandrovich of Russia
12. Alexander II of Russia
6. Alexander III of Russia
13. Princess Marie of Hesse
3. Grand Duchess Xenia Alexandrovna of Russia
14. Christian IX of Denmark
7. Princess Dagmar of Denmark
15. Princess Louise of Hesse-Kassel
