= Lucien Lelong =

French fashion designer (1889–1958)

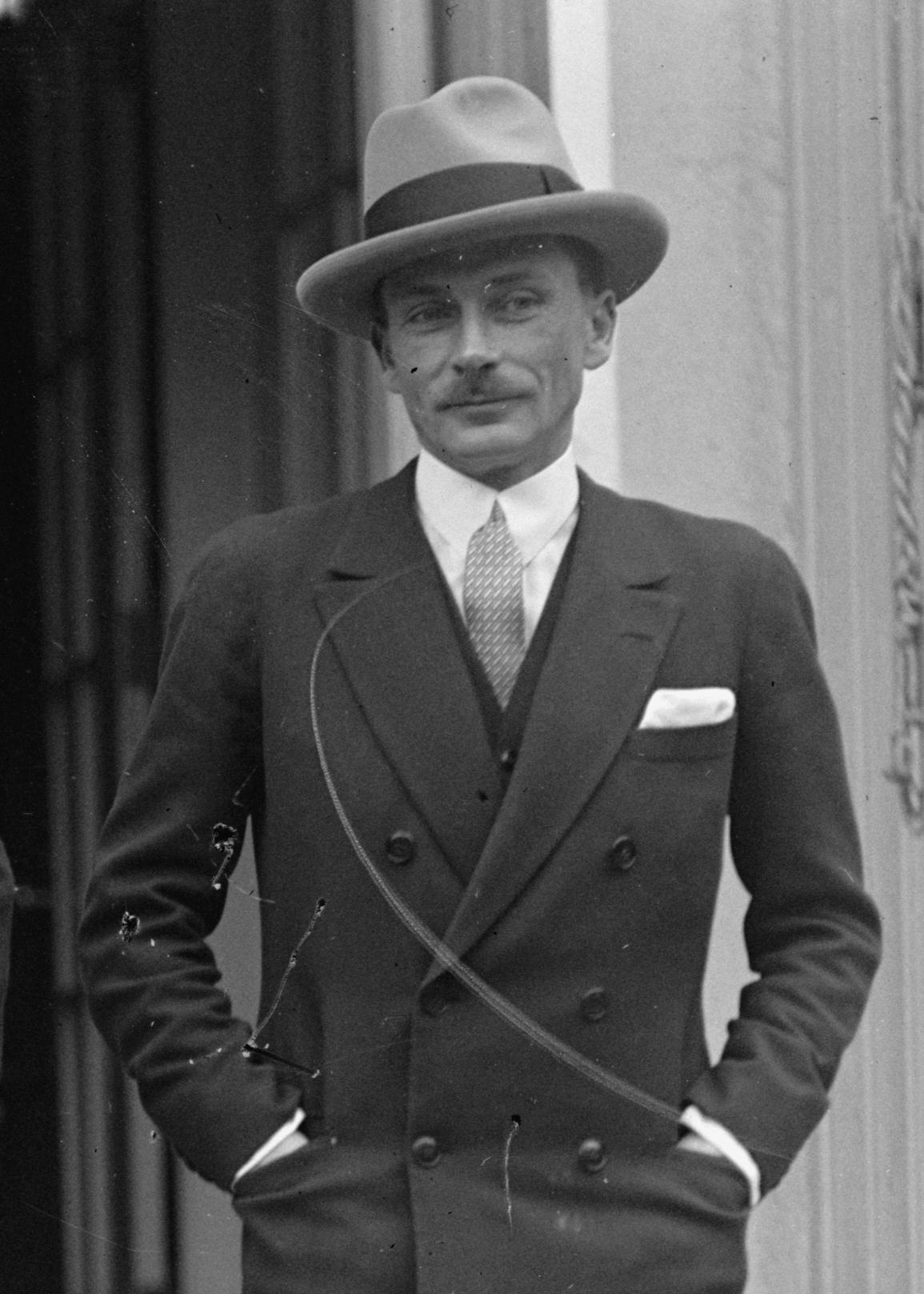
- Lelong in 1925
- Born: October 11, 1889; Paris, France
- Died: May 11, 1958 (aged 68); Anglet, France
- Education: École des hautes études commerciales
- Spouses: Anne-Marie Audoy (m. 1919; div. 1927) Natalia Pavlovna Paley (m. 1927; div. 1937) Sanda Annette Dancovici (m. 1954)

Signature
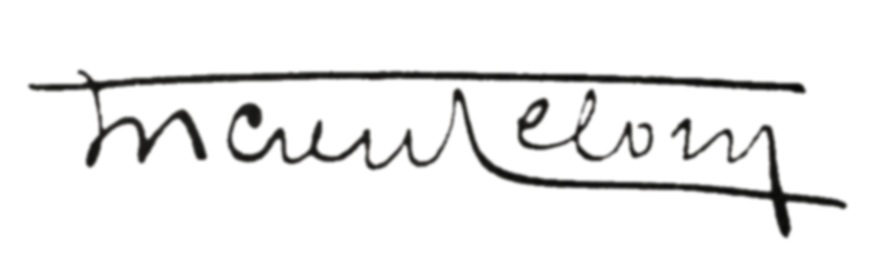

Lucien Lelong (French: [lysjɛ̃ ləlɔ̃]; 11 October 1889 – 11 May 1958) was a French couturier who was prominent from the 1920s to the 1940s. His couture fashion house was one of the largest in Paris in the interwar period, and Lelong was an important figure in the management of the French fashion industry during World War II.

== Early life, education and war service ==
Lelong was born in Paris to Arthur Camille Joseph Lelong and Éléonore Marie Lambelet, couturiers and owners of a fashion store called A.E. Lelong on Place de la Madeleine. He attended the École des hautes études commerciales in Paris between 1911 and 1913, first studying political science but graduating with a business degree. He also learned about fabric from his uncle, a fabric merchant, but received no formal training in fashion design. The first Lelong designs were featured in Vogue magazine in 1913.

Lelong was drafted for military service in the First World War in 1914, interrupting the creation and presentation of his first collection. He served as an intelligence officer, spent time in the trenches, and suffered shrapnel wounds to his face. He was awarded the Croix de Guerre.

== Fashion career ==
He returned to the family business in 1918 and by 1921, the business employed 17 people and was renamed 'Lucien Lelong'. In the following years, Lucien Lelong was recognised as an up-and-coming fashion house, alongside those of Jean Patou and Edward Molyneux. Lelong offered a discount to society ladies who agreed to be photographed wearing his designs.

In 1924, Lelong moved his fashion house to Avenue Matignon in Paris' 8th arrondissment and began creating perfume. Between 1925 and 1952, he created and sold over 40 perfumes. Lelong's early perfumes were called A, B, C, J and N; their simple names "created an aura of mystery and romance". His perfume packaging was initially purely functional but, as demand increased, Lelong began to recognise the value of decorative packaging. Lelong designed most of his own perfume bottles, taking inspiration from fabrics, garlands, feathers and modern architecture. For his perfume Ting-a-Ling, Lelong designed a gold bottle with six jingle bells.

In 1926, Lelong was made a Knight of the Legion of Honour, and in 1928 he was inducted as a committee member of the Chambre Syndicale de la Couture, an organisation of French haute couture fashion houses.

In the 1930s, in response to the Great Depression, Lelong was a pioneer of the concept of ready-to-wear luxury clothing. His first ready-to-wear collection was called Robes d'Edition and was released in 1934. Vionnet and Patou had both tried similar ventures before, but neither had lasted more than a few months. Robes d'Edition filled a niche in between manufactured and bespoke clothing; designs were made in five sizes with alterations being able to be added to the garment's cost. Only a limited number of reproductions were made, with designs being frequently introduced and retired; in an interview with Vogue, Lelong likened the idea to that of a limited edition of a book. By the autumn of 1934, the Edition range alone employed 600 workers year-round. The range was discontinued in 1940 after the German occupation of Paris.

In 1937, Lelong was unanimously elected president of the Chambre Syndicale de la Couture. In 1938, he oversaw the renegotiation of collective agreements with the Chambre Syndicale's unions, primarily the socialist GCT and Christian labour unions. He would serve as president until 1945.

=== Work in America ===
French fashion was a major exporter to the US and Lelong had excellent relationships with American firms. In 1925, Lelong was offered a study trip to the US by the French Ministries of Fine Arts, Public Instruction, and Labour. He used the trip to visit American factories, met labour experts in Washington, DC, and observe American women in order to produce garments that met their needs. He opened a perfume branch in Chicago in 1928, and by July 1929 had leased a New York office at 657 Fifth Avenue to serve as an East Coast headquarters and manage Lelong's sales to US department stores.

Lelong's 1931 visit to America was organised and publicised by Edward Bernays; Lelong talked about perfume and design on CBS and was invited by Vogue editor Edna Woolman Chase to a Fashion Group meeting.

Lelong traveled to America in October 1935 on a study trip commissioned by Pierre Laval, then Minister for Foreign Affairs, to report on working conditions in the American clothing industry. In the winter of 1937, Lelong visited Hollywood which was "an emerging fashion city" at the time.

=== War-time activities ===
==== Pre-occupation ====
The Second World War had "an immediate effect on Paris fashion", and many houses closed, including Mainbocher, Charles James, and Schiaparelli. Lelong was mobilised on 28 August 1939, at the same time as many other members of the fashion industry, as a lieutenant in the 3rd Cuirassier Regiment. Lelong closed the Chambre Syndicale's school and placed Chambre secretary Daniel Gorin in charge of the organisation. Ten days after being mobilised, Lelong was demobilised and sent back to Paris; American journalist Kathleen Cannell suggested that this was on the orders of the French government.

On 12 September, Lelong called a committee meeting where the potential for resuming work was discussed; one of the most important dilemmas was how to keep the sector's 25,000 workers employed and avoid redundancies. In a telegram to Edna Woolman Chase, Lelong wrote: "Am doing utmost to find financial and commercial solution. Allowing for the reopening of houses and the living of thousands of women." He negotiated with the Ministry of Labor and the Military Commissariat to provide work for unemployed workers making military uniforms, carryalls and blankets. Fashion houses began to assess which other cities would be best to relocate to: Cannes, Vichy, or Biarritz, where most houses already had branches.

The haute couture industry also faced significant financial pressures. By early October 1939, 90% of houses were closed with the remaining 10% working with reduced staff. Couturiers had to keep paying taxes, rent and wages but were unable to recover credit extended to their private customers which amounted to a value of 100 million francs. Lelong expected that the lost profits from the autumn collections, the sharp reduction in clients, and the loss of foreign markets meant that fashion houses would not be able to turn a profit and lobbied the government to extend tax deadlines and give preferential terms to couturiers. For unemployed workers who were owed redundancy pay, Lelong negotiated a delay citing the exceptional circumstances.

The French government then announced that it was important that civilian activities continued as normal and that the couture business should reopen since it was an important export industry. In a meeting of the Chambre Syndicale on 6 October, Lelong said that "opening one's house can be considered an act of national duty". Midseason collections were organised and, despite Lelong's reluctance, he showed thirty silhouettes in a show in early November. In a Christmas show, Lelong presented "his first wartime collection" with designs in red, white and blue.

In March 1940, when the government introduced price regulation and rationing, haute couture was "left untouched". The Chambre Syndicale in April gave Lelong full responsibility for the industry during the war and he was appointed to a post in the Ministry of Information as head of a unit in charge of developing French luxury business during wartime. He announced that "no amount of terrorizing by the Nazis would deter them from showing their midseason collections and carrying on."

==== Under occupation ====
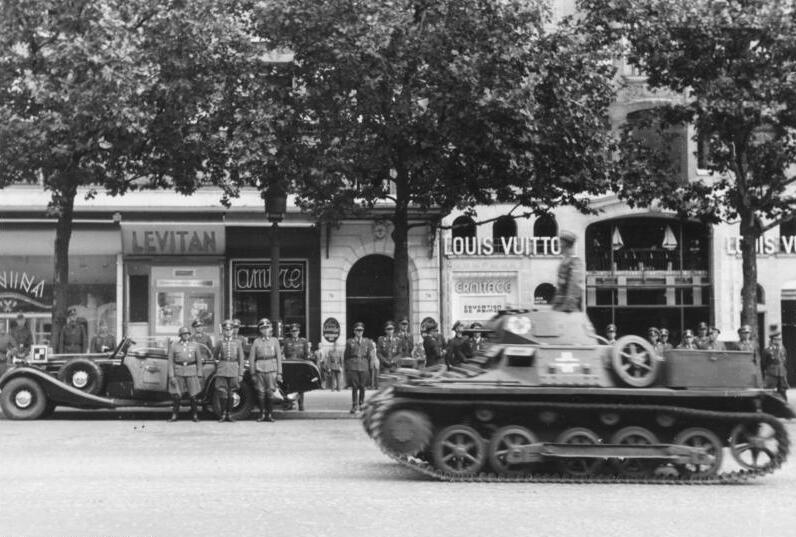
A German tank passing a Louis Vuitton store during the occupation of Paris. Fashion houses which acquiesced to Nazi rules were allowed to stay open during the occupation.

When Nazi Germany occupied Paris in June 1940, German forces took over the Chambre Syndicale's office and seized its files with the intention of relocating Paris' fashion industry to Berlin or Vienna to create a global fashion centre which was more coordinated with Nazi ideals. In August 1940, Lelong presented plans to the Chambre Syndicale supporting widespread industry reorganisation along corporatist lines in order to work within the German occupation decrees. The law of 16 August 1940 created comités d'organisation which would oversee production and resource distribution, effectively moving occupied France to a state-controlled economy. Lelong was appointed to chair Group I, a group which covered the couture sector within the new committee system of industry set up under the Ministry of Production. Between the summer of 1940 and early 1942, Lelong did not call any further meetings of the Chambre Syndicale.

Lelong persuaded the Nazis to keep the industry in Paris, arguing that any attempt at relocation would kill the industry due to its fragile supply chains; his fashion house was one of those allowed to stay open during the occupation and largely catered to the wives and daughters of Nazi officers who were some of the only people allowed to buy haute couture garments.

In January 1942, Lelong said that, during the war, "our single preoccupation was to keep Paris Couture alive despite the innumerable difficulties" and that his work with both the French and occupation governments was "inspired by our only concern of defending the profession's interests."

Forbes describes Lelong's position during the war as "working in a lot of grey areas", and after the war, Lelong was investigated as a Nazi collaborator. However, the combination of New York's fashion press being "eager to restore the good name of French fashion" and the French government wanting to revive fashion as an important export industry meant that no couturiers faced formal collaboration charges. Lelong was acquitted of being a collaborator, with a judge overseeing his case ruling that his cooperation was minimal and had been done to save French workers (12,000 of whom worked in the couture industry), Jewish lives and protect French culture.

=== Post-liberation and Théâtre de la Mode ===
After France was liberated in 1944, living conditions did not immediately improve. Raoul Dautry, the Minister of Reconstruction and Urban Development, asked Robert Ricci (the son of Nina Ricci) to come up with a fundraising idea to help with war efforts. Ricci went to Lelong to discuss ideas and came up with an exhibit of fashion dolls: the Théâtre de la Mode. The dolls were 27 inches (69 cm) high wire figures with plaster faces by Joan Rebull, a Catalan sculptor. They were dressed in garments designed by 40 couturiers (including Balenciaga, Schiaparelli, Paquin, Patou, Hermès, Madame Grès and Lelong himself) and were arranged together in different settings designed by Chambre Syndicale members as well as Jean Cocteau and Christian Bérard. Dolls were used so that less material was needed; Lelong said that the exhibition was "not intended to represent luxury or lavish use of materials; it is instead a proof of ingenuity and good taste." The exhibition toured internationally and was seen to be a great success.

=== Design ===
Lelong himself did not create the garments that bore his label; instead, he employed designers who worked for him to turn his ideas into clothing. "He did not design himself, but worked through his designers," wrote Christian Dior, who was a member of the Lelong team from 1941 until 1946, during which time he created the collections in collaboration with Pierre Balmain. "Nevertheless," Dior continued, "in the course of his career as couturier his collections retained a style which was really his own and greatly resembled him." Other designers who worked for Lelong included Nadine Robinson and Hubert de Givenchy.

Lelong used the adjective 'kinetic' to describe the silhouette that he developed from 1925 onwards, which succeeded the garçonne style of the early 1920s. According to Lelong the silhouette was meant to "[give] the wearer a pleasing appearance while in motion".

=== Clientele ===
Among Lelong's clients were Marie Duhamel, Nora Barnacle (wife of James Joyce), Jeanne Ternisien (wife of the banker Georges Nelze), the Duchess de la Rochefoucauld, Greta Garbo, Gloria Swanson, Colette, and Rose Kennedy.

In 1935, Lelong designed the wedding dress of Josée Laval for her wedding to René de Chambrun.

== Retirement and death ==
Lelong's health deteriorated in 1947 and caused the end of his career; he retired from couture in August 1948, leaving his fall collection unfinished, and only continued his perfume business. He married for the third time in 1954, to Sanda Dancovici, after having retired in 1952. They lived together near Biarritz in the commune of Anglet, at the Domaine de Courbois, which they restored at great expense. They played golf with the Duke of Windsor and held receptions at the estate. They had a daughter, Christine.

Lelong died from complications from a stroke in May 1958 while visiting Anglet, France.

== Personal life ==
Lelong's brother Pierre ran a French textile firm called Soieries Péhel which shared Lelong's New York offices; the two brothers often traveled to America together.

=== Marriages ===
Lelong was married three times. His wives were:

- Anne-Marie Audoy (1899-1935), whom he married in 1919 and divorced in 1927. They had one daughter, Nicole (born 1920), who became the directrice of her father's fashion house in 1947; she was also the namesake of his 1938 lipstick introduction, Nicole Pink. Anne-Marie Lelong, who returned to her maiden name after the Lelongs' divorce, married Baron Bertrand Clauzel in 1930.
- Princess Natalie Paley (1905–1981), who had worked as a saleswoman in the Lelong perfume department and became one of the house's fashion models in the 1930s. They married on 10 August 1927. The couple separated in 1931, and divorced in 1936. After splitting from Lelong, she pursued a career in acting in Hollywood. She was a daughter of Grand Duke Paul Alexandrovich of Russia and his morganatic wife, Olga Karnovich and married John Chapman Wilson in 1937.
- Sanda Annette Dancovici (1919-2001), an actress, whom he married in 1954; she was the daughter of Mircea Danovici. After Lelong's death she married, in 1959, French journalist Maurice Goudeket, the widower of Colette.

== Legacy ==
Hamish Bowles called Lelong the "fore-father of today's fashion industry titans".

Pieces by Lelong are included in several museum collections including those of the Metropolitan Museum of Art, the V&A Museum, the Fashion Institute of Design & Merchandising Museum, and Los Angeles County Museum of Art. Vivien Leigh's 1940s embroidered Lelong jacket is in the collection of the Fashion Museum, Bath.

The Fashion Institute of Technology in New York held an exhibition of Lelong's work in 2006 titled Modern Master: Lucien Lelong, Couturier (1918-1948).

Lelong was played by John Malkovich in Apple TV+'s The New Look in 2024.
