= István Mészáros =

István Mészáros may refer to:

- István Mészáros (canoeist), Hungarian sprint canoeist who competed in the mid-1950s
- István Mészáros (philosopher) (1930–2017), Hungarian-born, British professor of Marxist thought
- István Mészáros (footballer, born 1899) (1899–1944), Hungarian footballer
- István Mészáros (footballer, born 1980), Hungarian footballer
- István Mészáros (weightlifter) (born 1967), Hungarian weightlifter
