= Ferenc Mészáros =

Ferenc Mészáros is the name of:

- Ferenc Mészáros (footballer, born 1919) (1919–1977), Hungarian/Romanian footballer
- Ferenc Mészáros (footballer, born 1950) (1950–2023), Hungarian footballer
- Ferenc Mészáros (footballer, born 1963) (born 1963), Hungarian footballer
