= Vladimir Paley =

Russian nobleman and poet (1897–1918)

Prince Vladimir Pavlovich
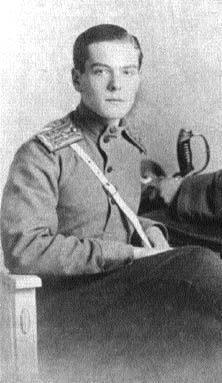
- Vladimir, circa 1915
- Born: 9 January 1897; Saint Petersburg, Russian Empire
- Died: 18 July 1918 (aged 21); Alapayevsk, Russian SFSR
- Cause of death: Murder
- House: Holstein-Gottorp-Romanov
- Father: Grand Duke Paul Alexandrovich of Russia
- Mother: Olga Valerianovna Karnovich

Prince Vladimir Pavlovich Paley (Russian: Князь Владимир Павлович Палей; 9 January 1897 – 18 July 1918) was a Russian nobleman and poet who was murdered by the Bolsheviks when he was 21 years old.

== Life ==
He was born as Vladimir von Pistohlkors in Saint Petersburg, Russia, on 9 January 1897. His father was Grand Duke Paul Alexandrovich of Russia, the youngest child of Emperor Alexander II. His mother was his father's mistress, Olga Valerianovna Karnovich, who was still married to Erich Gerhard von Pistohlkors at that time. He was nicknamed "Volodia" by his family.

In 1902, Grand Duke Paul—a widower after his short marriage to Princess Alexandra of Greece and Denmark, with whom he had two children before her premature death in childbirth—wed Olga morganatically. In 1904, she was created Countess von Hohenfelsen by Prince Regent Luitpold of Bavaria, thus providing Vladimir with the title of Count Vladimir von Hohenfelsen. In 1915, Olga was created Princess Paley by Nicholas II, which allowed Vladimir to use the title of Prince Paley.

Prince Vladimir had two elder half-siblings from his father's marriage to Alexandra Georgievna of Greece, née Princess Alexandra of Greece and Denmark: Grand Duchess Maria Pavlovna of Russia and Grand Duke Dmitri Pavlovich of Russia. His birth and existence was hidden from them for the first five years of his life. His half-sister found out about Vladimir from a photograph hidden in their father's pocket. He had two full sisters, both of whom eventually were styled as Her Serene Highness Princess Paley: Irina Pavlovna and Natalia Pavlovna. He also had three half-siblings from his mother's first marriage: Alexander Erikovich von Pistohlkors, Olga Erikovna von Pistohlkors, and Marianna Erikovna (or Marianne) von Pistohlkors.

He spent his childhood in Paris and later graduated from the Corps des Pages, an aristocratic military school in Saint Petersburg. In December 1914, he entered the regiment of the Emperor’s Hussars and fought with the Russian army in the First World War. He was promoted to lieutenant and decorated as a war hero with the Order of Saint Anne.

Even as a teenager, he showed remarkable talent as a poet. He published two volumes of poetry (1916 and 1918) and wrote several plays and essays, as well as a French translation of Grand Duke Konstantin Konstantinovitch's play, The King of the Jews.

In the summer of 1917, he and his family were placed for a short time under house arrest by the Provisional Government, because of a poem he wrote about Aleksandr Kerensky. In March 1918, he was arrested by the Bolsheviks and sent to exile in Vyatka, and later in Ekaterinburg and Alapaevsk. He was brutally murdered in a mineshaft near Alapaevsk, together with his cousins Prince Ioann Konstantinovich of Russia, Prince Konstantine Konstantinovich of Russia, Prince Igor Konstantinovich of Russia, and other relatives. Their bodies were recovered by the Imperial White Army and placed in coffins, then moved around during fighting with the Red Army. They were brought and buried months later at the Russian Mission Orthodox cemetery in Beijing, China, the site of which was destroyed during the Cultural Revolution and is now a parking area.

== Legacy ==
A biography of Prince Vladimir Paley by Andrey Baranovsky was published in 1997 in Russian, and another (A Poet Among The Romanovs) by Jorge F. Saenz was published in 2004, in both Russian and English. He is now venerated by the Russian Orthodox Church as a Saint and martyr.

His elder half-sister Maria described him extensively in her memoirs:

"Volodia was an extraordinary being, a living instrument of rare sensitiveness which could of itself produce sounds of startling melody and purity and create a world of bright images and harmonies. He confirmed the theory that exceptional children are born of a great and exceptional love. When he was still a baby there was something indefinable about him that set him apart from the others. When he was a child, in fact, I considered him a nuisance, affected, and priggish. But later I understood that he was a being older than his years lost in the milieu to which his age assigned him. His parents saw how different he was from the others and wisely did not try to shape him according to pattern as had been done with us. They allowed him comparative freedom to develop his unusual abilities. While still a child he wrote good verse and very fine plays, to be acted by his small sisters. He played the piano; he painted; and at a very early age astounded people by his extensive reading and his extraordinary memory."

== Ancestry ==
Ancestors of Vladimir Paley

16. Paul I of Russia
8. Nicholas I of Russia
17. Duchess Sophie Dorothea of Württemburg
4. Alexander II of Russia
18. Frederick William III of Prussia
9. Princess Charlotte of Prussia
19. Duchess Louise of Mecklenburg-Strelitz
2. Grand Duke Paul Alexandrovich of Russia
20. Louis I, Grand Duke of Hesse and by Rhine
10. Louis II, Grand Duke of Hesse and by Rhine
21. Princess Louise of Hesse-Darmstadt
5. Princess Marie of Hesse and by Rhine
22. Charles Louis, Hereditary Prince of Baden
11. Princess Wilhelmine of Baden
23. Princess Amalie of Hesse-Darmstadt
1. Prince Vladimir Pavlovich Paley
6. Valerian Karnovich
3. Olga Valerianovna Karnovich
7. Olga Vasilyevna Meszaros

== See also ==
- Romanov sainthood
- Martyrs of Alapayevsk
