= Princess Alexandra of Greece and Denmark =

Greek and Russian princess (1870–1891)

Princess Alexandra
- Grand Duchess Alexandra Georgievna of Russia
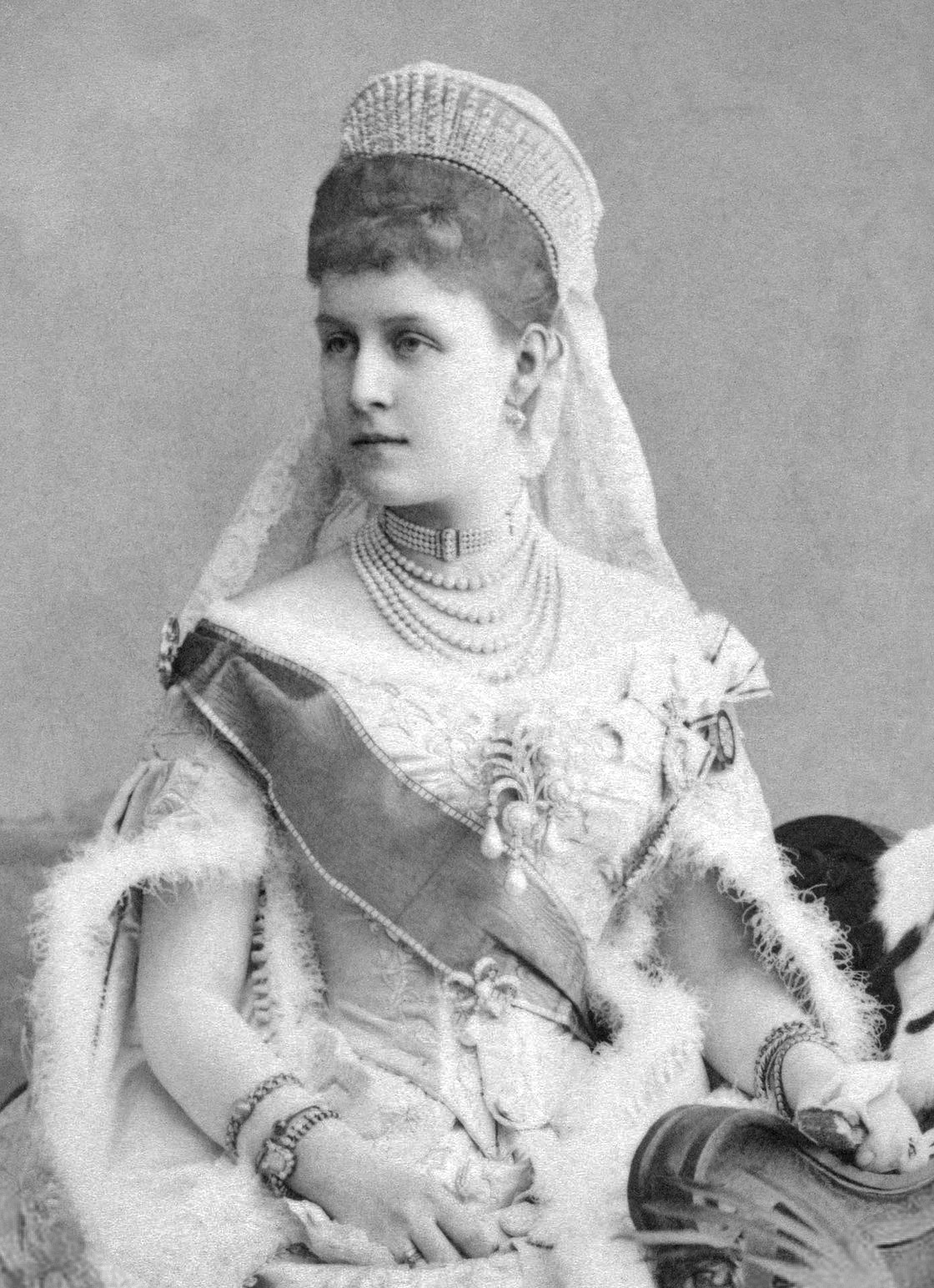
- Alexandra in Russian court dress, c. 1890
- Born: 30 August 1870; Mon Repos, Corfu, Greece
- Died: 24 September 1891 (aged 21); Ilyinskoye Estate, Moscow Governorate, Russia
- Burial: Royal Cemetery, Tatoi Palace, Greece
- Spouse: Grand Duke Paul Alexandrovich of Russia (m. 1889)
- Issue: Grand Duchess Maria Pavlovna; Grand Duke Dmitri Pavlovich
- House: Glücksburg
- Father: George I of Greece
- Mother: Olga Constantinovna of Russia

Princess Alexandra of Greece and Denmark (Greek: Αλεξάνδρα, romanized: Alexándra), later known as Grand Duchess Alexandra Georgievna of Russia (Russian: Алекса́ндра Гео́ргиевна; 30 August [O.S. 18 August] 1870 – 24 September [O.S. 12 September] 1891), was a member of the Greek royal family by birth and of the Russian imperial family by marriage.

Alexandra was the daughter of George I of Greece and Olga Constantinovna of Russia, and grew up in Athens. In 1889, she married Grand Duke Paul Alexandrovich of Russia, her first cousin once removed. The couple settled in Saint Petersburg and they had two children: Grand Duchess Maria Pavlovna (1890–1958) and Grand Duke Dmitri Pavlovich (1891–1942). She died of childbirth complications during the birth of her son in 1891.

== Early life ==
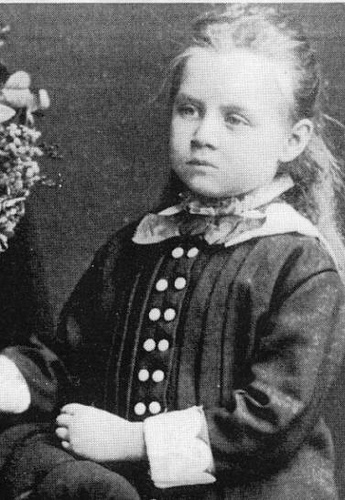
Princess Alexandra as a child in 1875

Princess Alexandra of Greece and Denmark was born on 30 August [O.S. 18 August] 1870 at Mon Repos, the summer residence of the Greek royal family on the island of Corfu. She was the third child and eldest daughter of King George I of Greece and his wife, Grand Duchess Olga Constantinovna of Russia. Alexandra's father was not a native Greek, but he had been born a Danish prince named Christian Wilhelm of Schleswig-Holstein-Sonderburg-Glücksburg, a son of Christian IX, King of Denmark, and he had been elected to the Greek throne at the age of seventeen. Five of his sons (Constantine, George, Nicholas, Andrew and Christopher), and two daughters (Alexandra and Maria), attained adulthood.

The Greek royal family was not wealthy by royal standards and they lived with simplicity. King George was a taciturn man, but contrary to the general approach of the time, he believed in happy rambunctious children. The long corridors of the royal palace in Athens were used by Alexandra and her siblings for all types of play and sometimes a "bike ride" would be led by the King himself. Raised by British nannies, English was the children's first language, but they spoke Greek between themselves. They also learned German and French.

Alexandra, nicknamed "Aline" within her family, or Greek Alix, to distinguish her from her aunt and godmother, Alexandra, Princess of Wales, had a sunny disposition and was much loved by her family. "She had one of those sweet and lovable natures that endeared her to everybody who came in touch with her," recalled her brother, Nicholas. "She looked young and beautiful, and ever since she was a child, life looked as it had nothing but joy and happiness in store for her."

Alexandra's playmates were her brother Nicholas and her sister Maria, who followed her in age. Alexandra spent many holidays in Denmark visiting her paternal grandparents. In Denmark, Alexandra and her siblings met their Russian and British cousins in large family gatherings.

== Marriage and children ==
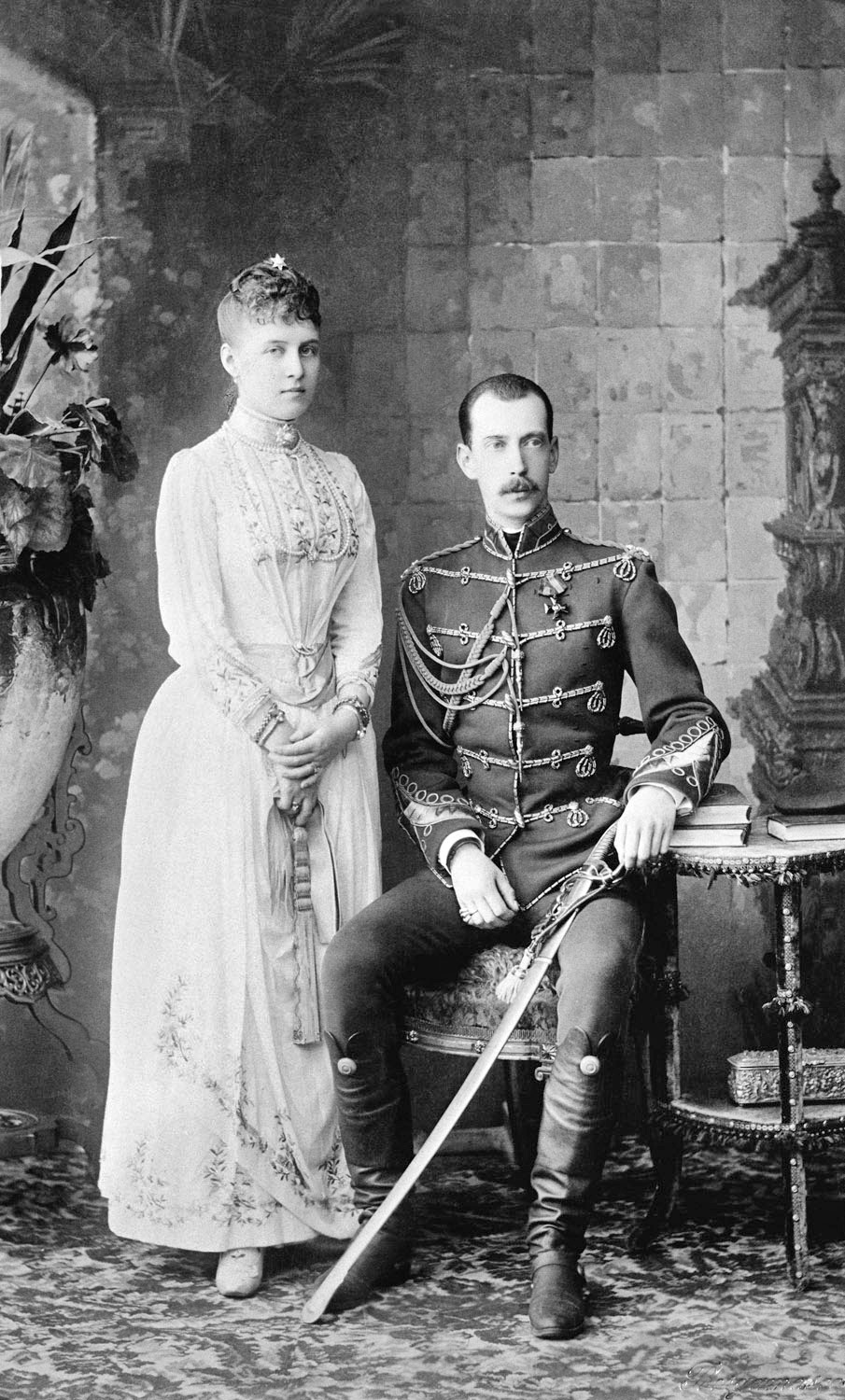
Engagement photograph of Princess Alexandra of Greece and Grand Duke Paul Alexandrovich of Russia.

When she was 18 years old, she was married to Grand Duke Paul Alexandrovich of Russia, her maternal first cousin once removed and the youngest child and sixth son of Emperor Alexander II and his first wife, Princess Marie of Hesse and by Rhine. They had become close when Grand Duke Paul spent winters in Greece due to his frequent respiratory illnesses. The Greek royal family also frequently spent holidays with the Romanov family on visits to Russia or Denmark. Their engagement was announced on 10 November 1888. The wedding took place on 17 June [O.S. 5 June] 1889 in St. Petersburg, at the chapel of the Winter Palace.

They had two children:

- Grand Duchess Maria Pavlovna (18 April [O.S. 6 April] 1890 – 13 December 1958)
- Grand Duke Dmitri Pavlovich (18 September 1891 – 5 March 1942)

== Death ==
Seven months into her second pregnancy, Alexandra took a walk with her friends on the bank of the Moskva River and jumped directly into a boat that was permanently moored there, but fell as she got in. The next day, she collapsed in the middle of a ball from violent labour pains. She gave birth to her son, Dimitri, lapsed into a fatal coma, and died six days later in the Romanovs' estate Ilyinskoe near Moscow. The Grand Duchess was buried in the Peter and Paul Cathedral, St. Petersburg. Her grieving husband had to be restrained from throwing himself into the grave with her.

Her husband later morganatically remarried Olga Karnovich. Alexandra's son would be involved in the murder of Grigori Rasputin, a friend of Tsarina Alexandra Feodorovna, in 1916.

In 1939 during the reign of her nephew George II of Greece, the Greek government obtained permission from the Soviet government under Joseph Stalin to rebury Princess Alexandra in Greece. Her body was removed from the vault in Leningrad and transferred by a Greek ship to Athens. It was finally laid to rest near the Tatoi Palace. Alexandra's marble tombstone over an empty tomb is still in its place in the Peter and Paul Cathedral.

The "Alexandra Maternity Hospital" (now "Alexandra General Hospital") in Athens was later named in her memory by another nephew, King Paul; it was affiliated with the University of Athens with a special remit to research and combat postpartum maternal mortality. Alexandras Avenue in Athens was also named after her.

== Ancestry ==
Ancestors of Princess Alexandra of Greece and Denmark

8. Frederick William, Duke of Schleswig-Holstein-Sonderburg-Glücksburg
4. Christian IX, King of Denmark
9. Princess Louise Caroline of Hesse-Kassel
2. George I, King of the Hellenes
10. Prince William of Hesse-Kassel
5. Princess Louise of Hesse-Kassel
11. Princess Charlotte of Denmark
1. Princess Alexandra of Greece and Denmark
12. Nicholas I, Emperor of Russia
6. Grand Duke Constantine Nikolaevich of Russia
13. Princess Charlotte of Prussia
3. Grand Duchess Olga Constantinovna of Russia
14. Joseph, Duke of Saxe-Altenburg
7. Princess Alexandra of Saxe-Altenburg
15. Duchess Amelia of Württemberg
