= Princess Paley =

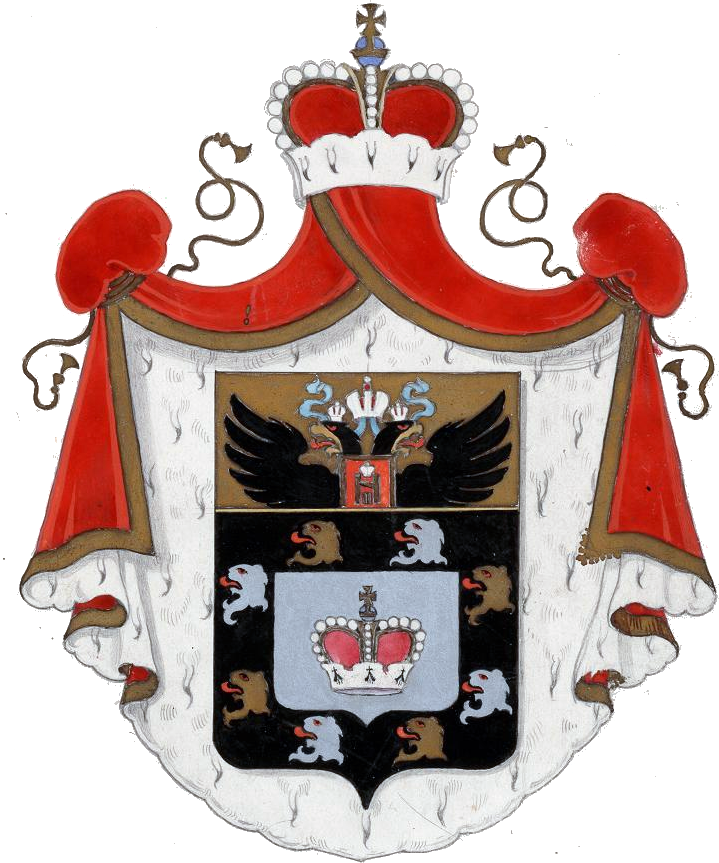
Coat of Arms of the Princes Paley

Princess Paley was a hereditary Russian noble title that was created in 1915 by Tsar Nicholas II of Russia for his uncle's second wife, Olga and their legitimate male-line descendants. They belonged to the Russian princely families and were part of the Russian nobility.

== History ==
It was first bestowed upon Olga Valerianovna Karnovich, Countess von Hohenfelsen, the morganatic second wife of Grand Duke Paul Alexandrovich of Russia. The style of Serene Highness accompanied the title, which was also used by the son and two daughters of Princess Olga's marriage with Grand Duke Paul Alexandrovich of Russia. With the murder of Prince Vladimir Alexandrovich Paley in Alapayevsk, on 18 July 1918 by the Bolsheviks, the family and the Paley title went extinct in male-line.

== Notable members ==
- Princess Olga Valerianovna Paley (1866–1929)
- Prince Vladimir Pavlovich Paley (1897–1918), a poet
- Princess Irina Pavlovna Paley (1903–1990), Princess Olga's elder daughter
- Princess Natalia Pavlovna Paley (1905–1981), Princess Olga's younger daughter

== See also ==
- Prince Paley
