= Princess Olga Paley =

Princess Olga Valerianovna
- Princess Paley; Countess von Hohenfelsen
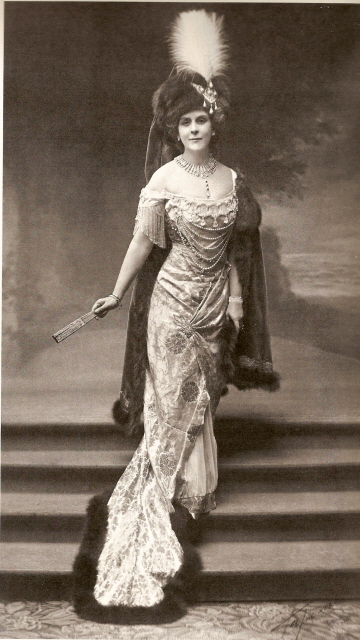
- Born: Olga Valerianovna Karnovich; 2 December 1865; Saint Petersburg, Russian Empire
- Died: 2 November 1929 (aged 63); Paris, France
- Spouse: Erich von Pistohlkors (m. 1884, divorced) Grand Duke Paul Alexandrovich of Russia (m. 1902; died 1919)
- Issue: Alexander Erikovich von Pistohlkors; Olga Erikovna von Pistohlkors; Olga Erikovna von Pistohlkors; Marianna Erikovna von Pistohlkors; Prince Vladimir Pavlovich Paley; Princess Irina Pavlovna Paley; Princess Natalia Pavlovna Paley
- Father: Valerian Gavrilovich Karnovich
- Mother: Olga Vasilyevna Meszaros

Princess Olga Valerianovna Paley (2 December 1865 – 2 November 1929) was the morganatic second wife of Grand Duke Paul Alexandrovich of Russia.

== Early life and first marriage ==
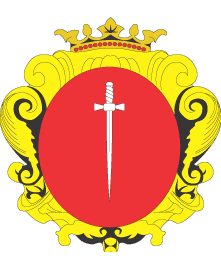
Coat of Arms of Karnovich family

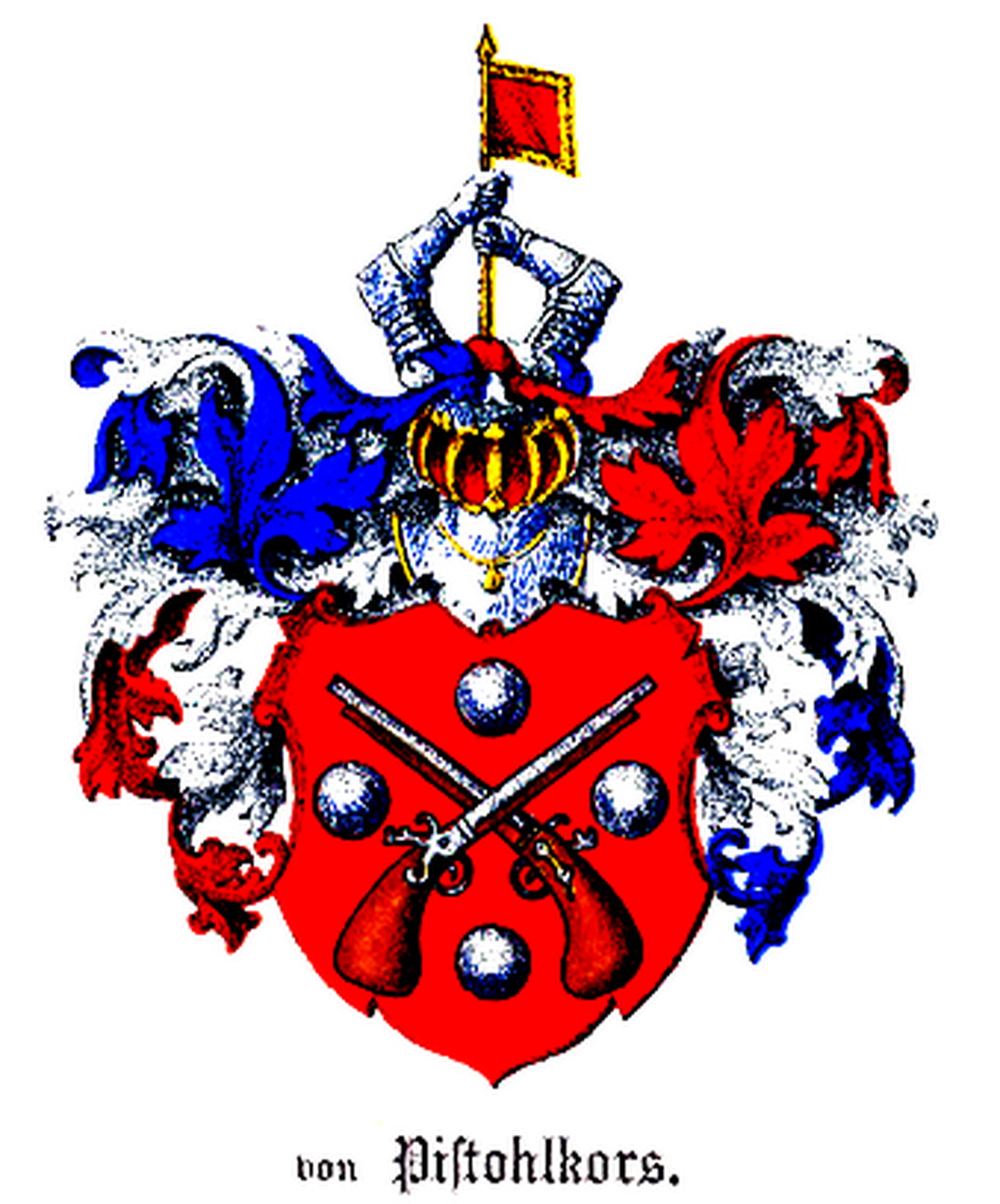
Coat of Arms of the Pistohlkors family

She was born as Olga Karnovich in Saint Petersburg, the daughter of a Russian nobleman, Valerian Gavrilovich Karnovich (1833-1891), State councilor, Imperial Chamberlain and Vice-Director of the Department of General Affairs of the Ministry of State Property, and his wife, Olga Vasilyevna Meszaros (1830-1919), who was of Hungarian and German ancestry and whose family had been settled in Russia since the 17th century. In 1884, in Riga, Olga Karnovich wed General Erich Gerhard von Pistohlkors (13 November 1853–8 November 1935), a member of the Pistohlkors family, part of the Baltic German nobility, by whom she had four children, one son and three daughters:

- Alexander Erikovich von Pistohlkors (1885–1944), who married firstly Alexandra Taneyeva (1888-1963) and secondly Maria Sokolova (b. 1901).
- Olga Erikovna von Pistohlkors (1886–1887).
- Olga Erikovna von Pistohlkors (1888–1963), married firstly in 1906 to Count Alexander Belzig von Kreutz (1883-1948) and secondly in 1922 to Prince Sergei Kudashev (1863-1933).
- Marianna Erikovna von Pistohlkors (1890–1976), married firstly in 1908 to Peter Durnovo (1883-1945), secondly in 1912 to Christoph von Derfelden (1888-1947) and thirdly in 1917 to Count Nikolaus von Zarnekau (1885-1976).

== Scandal and second marriage ==
Olga began an affair with Grand Duke Paul Alexandrovich, causing a great society scandal. Russian courtiers and members of Paul's family viewed Olga as a commoner and "fornicator." At the Winter Palace ball, she attended wearing the diamonds that the late Empress Maria Alexandrovna had bequeathed to Paul. The appalled Empress Maria Feodorovna of Russia recognized the imperial jewels and ordered her chamberlain to escort Olga out of the party. Paul's older brother Vladimir declared that "if [Olga] will become the wife of my brother, I will turn my back on her and she will never in life see my face again."

Paul asked permission from Emperor Nicholas II to marry Olga, but the Tsar initially refused. Olga's marriage to Pistohlkors was terminated by divorce, and she became pregnant with Prince Vladimir Pavlovich Paley.

In 1902, Paul fled to Paris with three million rubles and married Olga morganatically. Olga was not given any titles, because the marriage was not approved. Tsar Nicholas II was furious with Paul's disobedience, and he lamented that he "fear[ed] a whole colony of members of the Russian Imperial Family will be established in Paris with their semi-legitimate and illegitimate wives!" In 1904, Luitpold, Prince Regent of Bavaria granted Olga the title of Countess von Hohenfelsen. In 1915, Olga asked Grigori Rasputin to petition Tsar Nicholas II to grant her a Russian title. Nicholas acquiesced and granted her the title of Princess Paley.

Olga and Paul had three children:

- Prince Vladimir Pavlovich Paley (1897–1918), a poet.
- Princess Irina Pavlovna Paley (1903–1990), married her first cousin once removed Prince Feodor Alexandrovich and later Count Hubert Georges Edouard Conquere de Monbrison (1892-1981), owner of Château de Monbrison.
- Princess Natalia Pavlovna Paley (1905–1981), a fashion model and film actress, married firstly Lucien Lelong and secondly John Chapman Wilson.

Olga resented her stepson, Grand Duke Dmitri Pavlovich, because her son Vladimir could never be a grand duke like his older half-brother. She tried to turn Paul against his own son and wrote to her husband, "I have been telling you in every letter; 'don't trust Dmitri,' and I myself was deceived by his damned tricks! I have rarely hated people, as I hate him right now!" In October 1916, she was angry at Paul for giving fine wine from their cellar to Dmitri and said, "I would somehow understand if you treated the Sovereign to it,” she complained, “but to waste it on Dmitri... was totally unnecessary.”

Her stepdaughter, Grand Duchess Maria Pavlovna, described meeting her stepmother for the first time in 1907 in her memoirs:

"She was beautiful, very beautiful. An intelligent face, with features irregular but fine a skin remarkably white. [...] Father made the introductions. The Countess greeted my aunt with a profound curtsy and turned to me. We were both embarrassed. I did not know how to greet her; finally I timidly put forth my cheek."

In 1916, an Imperial decree approved the decision of the Yaroslavl Assembly of Nobles to include Sergei Valerianovich Karnovich (1853-1918) and his sister Olga in the Karnovich family genealogy chart, confirming their nobility birth right. By this time, their brothers Vladimir (1840-1850), Gavril (1846-1906) and Denis (1849-1908) were not alive. They also had one sister, Countess Lyubov Valerianovna Golovina (b. 1855), who was a good friend of Fyodor Mikhailovich Dostoevsky.

== Exile ==
Olga left Russia in 1920 with her two daughters and went to Finland, after her son and her husband were executed by the revolutionary government. She died during her exile in Paris, France, on 2 November 1929, at the age of 63.
