= Grand Duke Paul Alexandrovich of Russia =

Russian Grand Duke (1860–1919)

Grand Duke Paul Alexandrovich
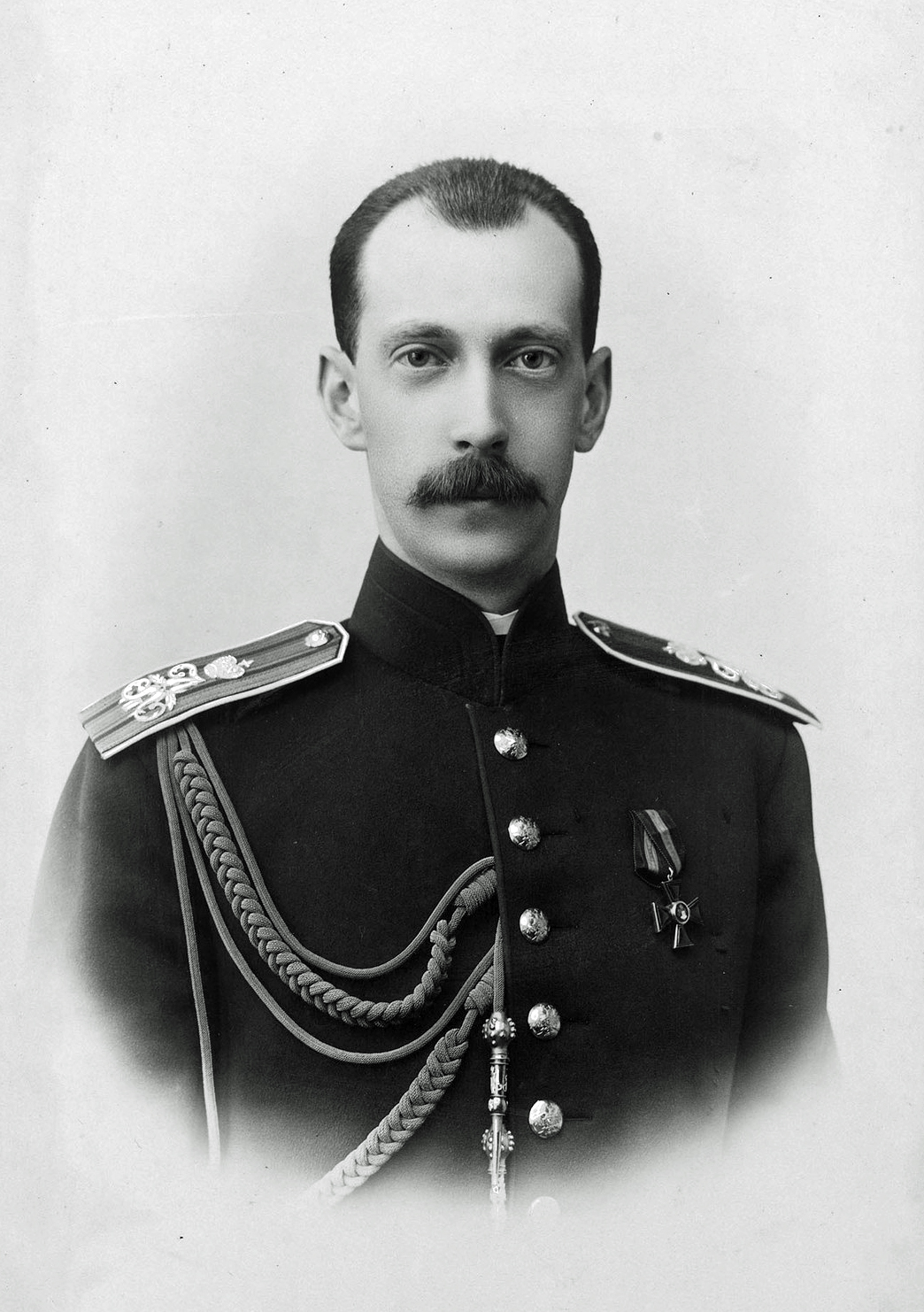
- Photograph c. 1890
- Born: 3 October 1860; Catherine Palace, St. Petersburg, Russian Empire
- Died: 28 January 1919 (aged 58); Peter and Paul Fortress, Petrograd, Russian Soviet Federative Socialist Republic
- Cause of death: Murder
- Spouse: Princess Alexandra of Greece and Denmark (m. 1889; died 1891) Olga Valerianovna Karnovich (m. 1902)
- Issue: Grand Duchess Maria Pavlovna; Grand Duke Dmitri Pavlovich; Prince Vladimir Paley; Princess Irina Paley; Princess Natalia Paley
- House: Holstein-Gottorp-Romanov
- Father: Alexander II of Russia
- Mother: Marie of Hesse and by Rhine

Grand Duke Paul Alexandrovich of Russia (Russian: Павел Александрович; 3 October 1860 – 28 January 1919) was the sixth son and youngest child of Emperor Alexander II of Russia by his first wife, Empress Maria Alexandrovna. He was a brother of Emperor Alexander III and uncle of Nicholas II, Russia's last monarch.

He entered the Imperial Russian Army, was a general in the cavalry and adjutant general to his brother Emperor Alexander III, and a Knight of the Order of St. Andrew. In 1889, he married Princess Alexandra of Greece and Denmark, his paternal first cousin once removed. The couple had a daughter and a son, but Alexandra died after the birth of their second child. In his widowhood, Grand Duke Paul began a relationship with Olga Valerianovna Karnovich, a married woman with three children. After obtaining a divorce for Olga and in defiance of strong family opposition, Grand Duke Paul married her in October 1902. As he contracted a morganatic marriage with a divorcée in defiance of the Tsar's prohibition, Grand Duke Paul was banished from living in Russia and deprived of his titles and privileges. Between 1902 and 1914, he lived in exile in Paris with his second wife, who gave him three children. In the spring of 1914, he settled back in Russia with his second family.

With the outbreak of World War I, Grand Duke Paul was appointed in command of the first corps of the Imperial Guard. Afflicted with ill health, he served only intermittently. During the last days of the Tsarist period, he was one of the few members of the Romanov family who remained close to Tsar Nicholas II and his wife, Alexandra Feodorovna. It fell upon Grand Duke Paul to inform Alexandra of Nicholas II's abdication.

After the fall of the Russian monarchy, Grand Duke Paul initially remained at his palace in Tsarskoe Selo during the period of the provisional government. With the Bolsheviks ascending to power, his palace was expropriated, and eventually he was arrested and sent to prison. In declining health, he was shot by the Bolsheviks with other Romanov relatives in the courtyard of the Peter and Paul Fortress in January 1919, and his remains were thrown into a common grave.

== Early life ==
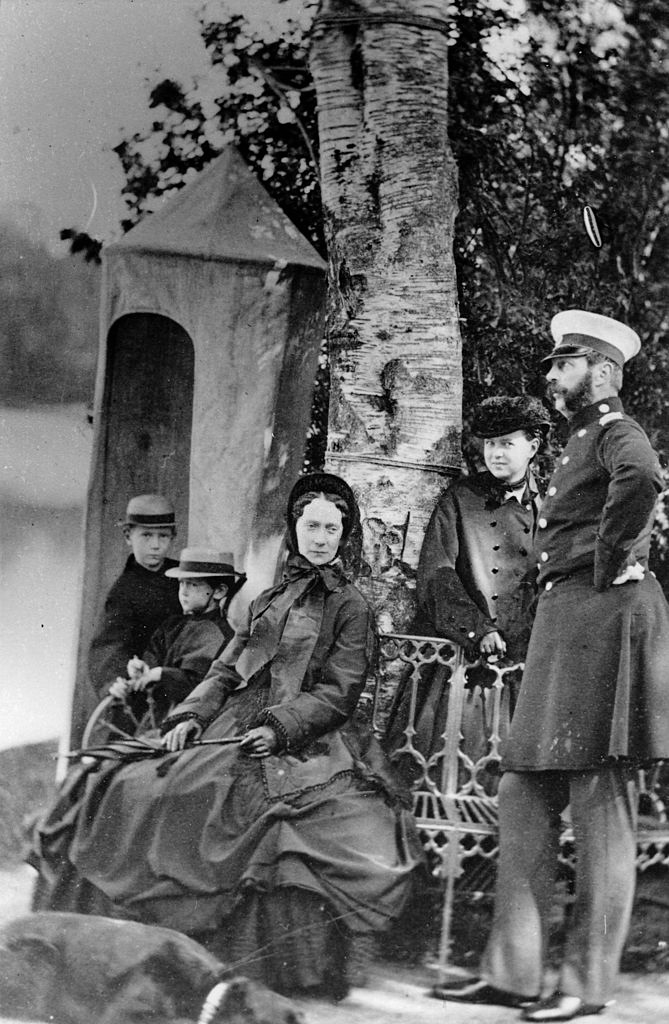
Tsar Alexander II of Russia with his wife and their three youngest children: Sergei, Paul and Maria

Grand Duke Paul was born on 3 October [O.S. 21 September] 1860 at the Catherine Palace, in Saint Petersburg. He was the eighth and youngest child of Tsar Alexander II of Russia and his first wife, Empress Maria Alexandrovna of Russia, née Princess Marie of Hesse and by Rhine.

As the youngest child in a large family, he was much loved by his parents and siblings. His early years were spent with his two siblings closest in age: his sister Marie, and his brother Sergei, from whom he was inseparable. By the time of Paul's birth, his mother was afflicted with tuberculosis and the doctors advised her not to have more children. Relations between Paul's parents ceased. The family was struck by tragedy in 1865 with the death of Paul's eldest brother, Nicholas Alexandrovich, Tsesarevich of Russia, when Paul was four years old. The following year, his father, Alexander II, started an affair with Princess Catherine Dolgorukova, who gave him three children.

Grand Duke Paul's early years were spent at Tsarskoye Selo and at the Winter Palace in Saint Petersburg, with vacations at Livadia, the family's Crimean retreat. As time passed and the Empress’ health dictated her to avoid the harsh Russian climate, the Tsarina spent long sojourns abroad with her three youngest children in Jugenheim outside Darmstadt, and the winters in the south of France. Paul was a protected delicate child; he never had a robust constitution.

== Education ==
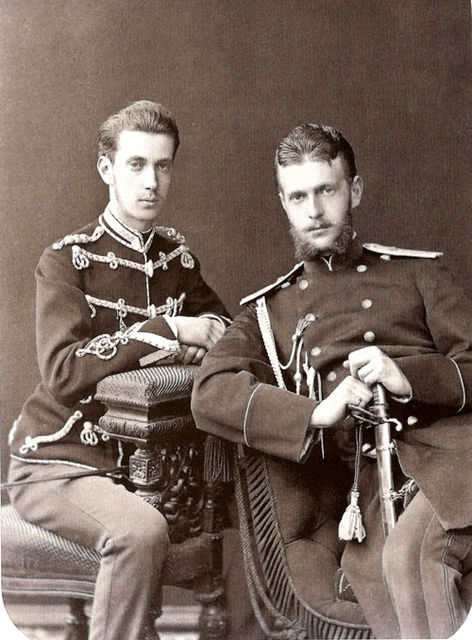
Grand Duke Paul Alexandrovich and his brother Grand Duke Sergei Alexandrovich

Grand Duke Paul was educated at home by private tutors. From the 1870s, Paul and his brother Sergei were kept in Russia by their studies. They were destined to follow a military career. From 1864 to 1885, their tutor was Admiral Dmitri Arsenyev, who encouraged his pupils to have a broad artistic education as well. Grand Duke Paul became a good amateur actor and an excellent dancer. He was widely liked due to his gentle character, very different from his boisterous elder brothers.

He was from birth a Guard cornet in an Infantry Regiment. However, his career advanced more slowly than that of his elder brothers. He became a Lieutenant in January 1874, but as he was still too young, he was the only one of Tsar Alexander II's sons not to take part in the Russo-Turkish War (1877–78).

Grand Duke Paul Alexandrovich was known as a gentle person, religious and accessible to people. In June 1880, he was afflicted by the death of his mother, whose slim figure and delicate health he inherited. Shortly after, his father married his mistress Catherine Dolgorukova. Grand Duke Paul, overprotected by his brother Sergei, did not know of the affair. Emotionally distraught by the news, he had to travel abroad to recuperate. Grand Duke Paul was on a trip to Italy with his brother Sergei when their father Alexander II was assassinated on 13 March [O.S. 1 March] 1881. Paul's eldest surviving brother, Alexander III, ascended to the Russian throne.

Since childhood, Paul was very attached to his brother Sergei, their closeness remaining even after Sergei's engagement and later marriage to Princess Elisabeth of Hesse and by Rhine. Paul accompanied the couple to England to meet Elisabeth's British grandmother, Queen Victoria, who was favorably impressed by Paul. After Sergei's marriage, Paul moved in with his brother and his new sister-in-law, who also became very close to him. The trio shared the same household for some time, and they made a trip together to Jerusalem in 1888. Grand Duke Paul suffered from weak lungs and spent periods abroad to recuperate. On medical advice, he visited Greece in 1887.

== First marriage ==
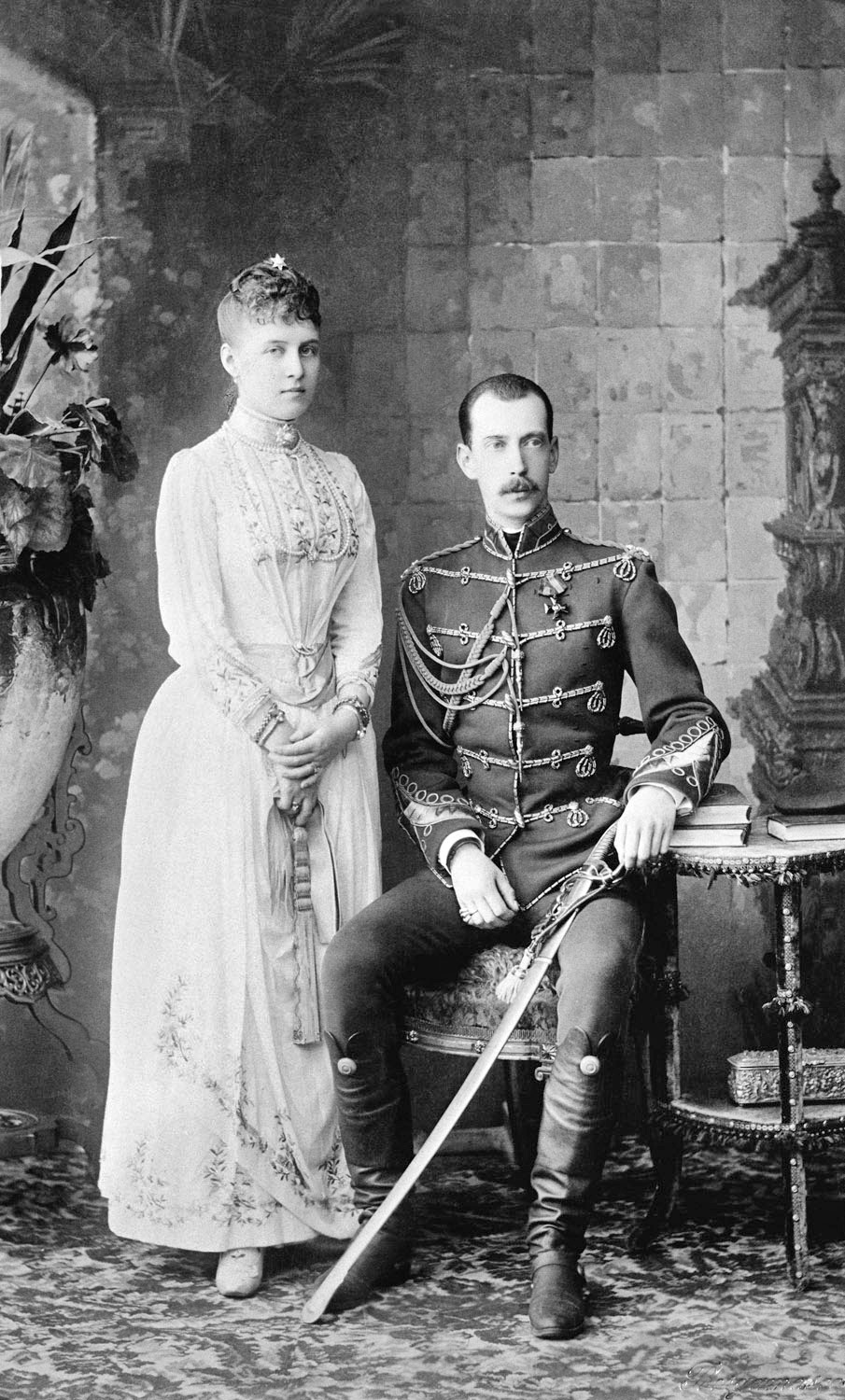
Grand Duke Paul Alexandrovich and Princess Alexandra of Greece. Engagement photograph. 1888.

During his visits to Greece, in the family atmosphere of his first cousin Queen Olga of Greece, Grand Duke Paul grew closer with Olga's eldest daughter, Princess Alexandra of Greece and Denmark. Alexandra's father, King George I of Greece, was a brother of Tsarina Maria Feodorovna, Paul's sister-in-law. During the silver wedding anniversary of King George and Queen Olga, Paul asked for Alexandra's hand and he was accepted. Alexandra had come to Russia several times during visits to her maternal relatives. She was lively and mischievous, while he was reserved. Their engagement was announced on 10 November 1888. The wedding took place on 17 June [O.S. 5 June] 1889 in St. Petersburg, at the chapel of the Winter Palace. Grand Duke Paul was 29 years old and his wife ten years younger.

Paul settled with his wife in his own palace in St. Petersburg on the English Embankment, No. 68. The mansion was located behind the Church of the Annunciation and faced the Corps de la Marine in the very center of Saint Petersburg. It was built in the Florentine renaissance revival style by the architect Alexander Krakau between 1859 and 1862 for Baron Alexander von Stieglitz, a prominent financier and the first Governor of the State Bank of the Russian Empire. After Stieglitz's death in 1884, the mansion was inherited by his adopted daughter, Nadezhda Polovtsova. She sold the property to the Treasury in 1887, and Grand Duke Paul bought it the same year. In 1889, he had the architect Maximilian Messmacher redesign some of the interiors, creating a Moorish Hall. The treasures of the house included the white marble staircase, the sitting room decorated with caryatids, the oak-paneled library, and the concert hall with portraits of great composers and panels depicting The Four Seasons.

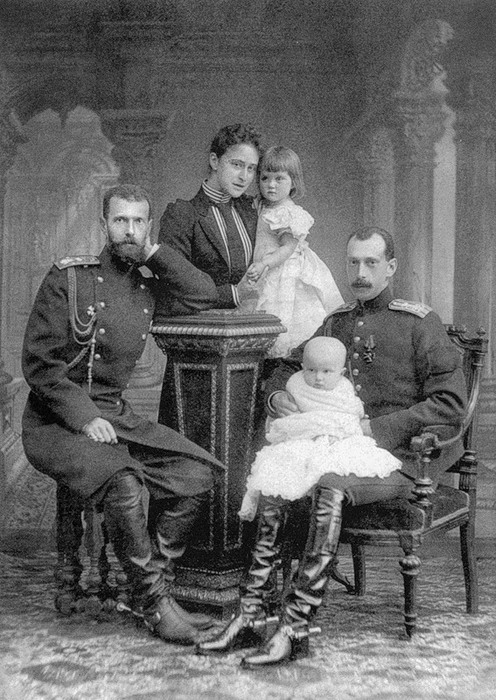
Grand Duke Sergei Alexandrovich; Sergei's wife, Grand Duchess Elizabeth Feodorovna holding Grand Duchess Maria Pavlovna; Grand Duke Paul Alexandrovich with his son, Dmitri, on his lap

Grand Duke Paul's marriage was happy, but brief. Alexandra, after a difficult first pregnancy, gave birth to a daughter on 18 April [O.S. 6 April] 1890, Grand Duchess Maria Pavlovna of Russia Alexandra was of a frail constitution and she was also homesick for her native Greece. In autumn of that same year, Grand Duke Paul took his wife for a holiday in Greece. At their return to Russia, he was appointed commander of the imperial house guards at Krasnoye Selo and, therefore, he was usually away fulfilling his military duties. Paul and his wife were given rooms at the Catherine Palace in Tsarskoye Selo, but they saw each other only on weekends. Although Grand Duke Sergei and his wife Elizabeth moved to Moscow in May 1891, the two couples remained very close. In the summer of 1891, Paul and Alexandra decided to spend some time with them at Ilinskoie, Sergei's country estate outside Moscow. While there, Alexandra, seven months pregnant with her second child, carelessly stepped into a waiting boat, causing premature labor and the following day gave birth prematurely to a son, Grand Duke Dmitri Pavlovich of Russia. Alexandra did not recover consciousness and died six days later on 24 September [O.S. 12 September] 1891.

Grand Duke Paul was deeply affected by Alexandra's death. During this period, his brother Sergei and Sergei's wife took care of Paul's motherless children in a pattern of behavior that would be repeated in the years to follow. In his widowhood, the grieving grand duke moved to Tsarskoye Selo, leaving his palace in St Peterburg that had been his home with Alexandra to never return. For a long time, the palace stood vacant. After that, the building changed many hands over time. When the revolution ended, the mansion was sold to the Russian Society for the Production of Equipment and Military Supplies. Eventually it became home to various Soviet institutions. The palace has survived to the present and today it is at the disposal of Saint Petersburg State University.

Grand Duke Paul's brother, Tsar Alexander III, died on 1 November [O.S. 20 October] 1894 and Paul's nephew, Nicholas II, became the new tsar. There was only an eight-year gap between uncle and nephew and Paul had known Nicholas II's wife, Alexandra Feodorovna, since she was a little girl, when in his youth he made many visits to his mother's native Darmstadt. Therefore, Grand Duke Paul was well-liked by the new Tsar and Tsarina.

== Second marriage ==
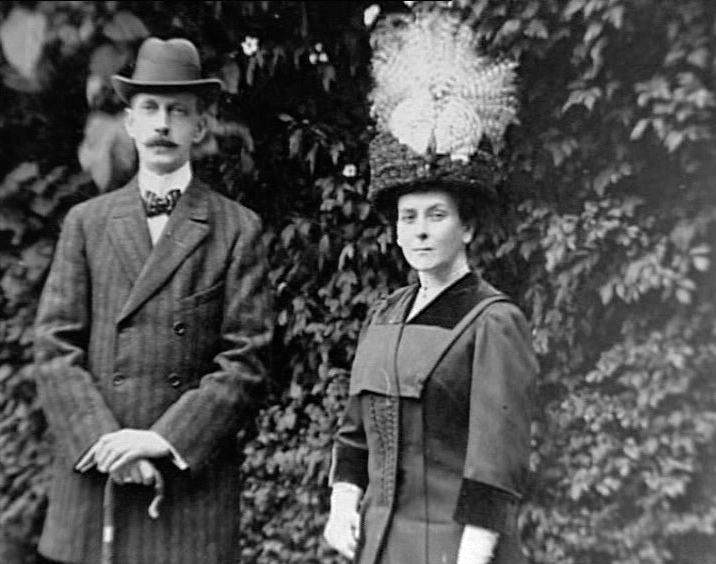
Grand Duke Paul and his second wife, Olga Valerianovna Karnovich

In 1895, Paul began an affair with a commoner, Olga Valerianovna Karnovich. Olga was married with three young children, a son and two daughters. Her husband, Eric von Pistohlkors, was an aide de camp of Paul's brother, Grand Duke Vladimir, and a captain in Paul's regiment. The affair initially remained secret, but it became public knowledge at court when Olga attended a court ball wearing a diamond necklace that had belonged to Paul's mother, Empress Maria Alexandrovna. The Dowager Empress Maria Feodorovna recognized the jewels and had Olga removed from the ball. In the subsequent scandal, Paul was moved to a different regimental command and Eric von Pistohlkors was sent away, but it was already too late. Olga was pregnant with Paul's child. She gave birth to a son, Vladimir, in January 1897, and Eric von Pistohlkors asked for a divorce.

Paul wanted to recognize Vladimir as his son and marry Olga, but his family opposed his union. His nephew Nicholas II of Russia and older brother Grand Duke Vladimir Alexandrovich of Russia were particularly angry about his intentions. His brother Grand Duke Sergei Alexandrovich of Russia and his sister-in-law, Grand Duchess Elizabeth begged him to reconsider and think about his children and his responsibilities in Russia. The relationship with his brother Sergei and his sister-in-law Elisabeth, so close before, never recovered. Grand Duke Vladimir asked Paul to swear a solemn oath that he would not marry Olga, which Paul did.

Despite his family's opposition, Paul remained infatuated with Olga. He lost interest in Maria and Dmitri and spent long periods abroad with his mistress. In 1900, he bought a mansion in Bois de Boulogne that had previously belonged to Princess Zinaida Ivanovna Yusupova, intending to settle there and marry Olga once she would obtain a divorce. Olga's divorce was granted in 1902. In August 1902, Paul's niece, Grand Duchess Elena Vladimirovna, married Prince Nicholas of Greece, Paul's former brother-in-law. It was the first time that Paul's former father-in-law, King George of Greece, came to Russia since the death of his daughter Alexandra. Their meeting was very uncomfortable. After the wedding celebrations were over, Paul left for Italy where Olga awaited him.

On 10 October 1902, Grand Duke Paul married Olga in a Greek Orthodox church in Livorno, Italy. Because he married morganatically and without Emperor Nicholas II's permission, Grand Duke Paul was banished from Russia; he was dismissed from his military commissions; all his properties were seized, and his brother Grand Duke Sergei was appointed as guardian of Maria and Dmitri.

Paul's family was outraged by his marriage. Emperor Nicholas II wrote to his mother: "The nearer the relative who refuses to submit to our family statutes the graver must be his punishment. . . How painful and distressing it all is and how ashamed one feels for the sake of our family before the world! What guarantee is there now that Cyril won't start the same sort of thing tomorrow and Boris, or Sergei Mikhailovich the day after? And, in the end, I fear, a whole colony of members of the Russian Imperial Family will be established in Paris with their semi-legitimate and illegitimate wives! God alone knows what times we are living in, when undisguised selfishness stifles all feelings of conscience, duty or even ordinary decency!". Nicholas' mother Dowager Empress Maria Feodorovna was equally angry: "This marriage of Uncle Paul's is really too distressing! Alas, he seems to have forgotten everything— his duty to his children, to his country, service honour, all, all, have been sacrificed ... How could he go through with it after all he had been told by his brothers and by us all? ... The thought of the misery of his poor little children for whom he had been everything and whom he has abandoned distresses me more than I can say ... And then there is the scandal! I am simply ashamed of it... So he is even slinging mud at our family! Awful, awful! And into what an awkward and disagreeable position it puts you, my poor Nicky, you who will have to punish him, because such an act cannot remain unpunished, and, into the bargain, marrying a divorced woman!".

== Exile ==
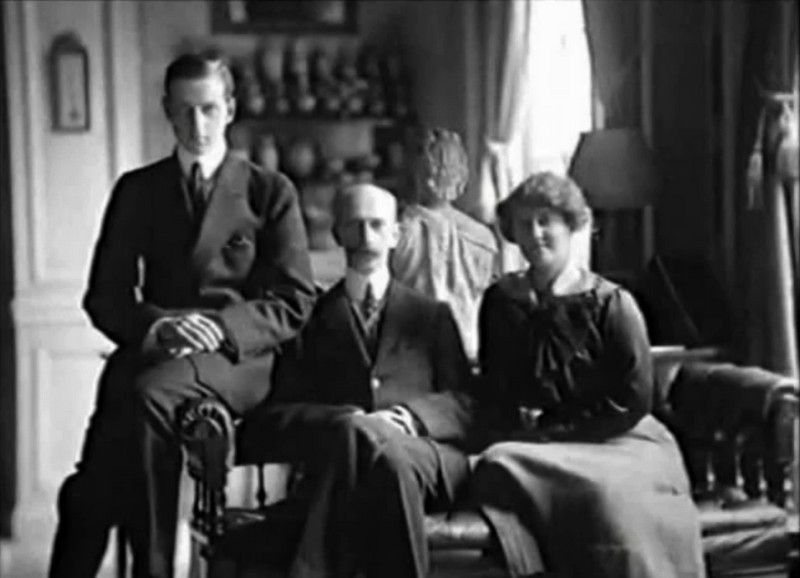
Grand Duke Paul with his children by his first marriage: Dimitri and Maria Pavlovna. Paris, 1914.

Grand Duke Paul and his second wife were still vacationing in Italy when they were banished from Russia. They settled in Boulogne-sur-Seine where a daughter, Irina, was born on 5 December [O.S. 22 November] 1903. In 1904, Grand Duke Paul arranged, through Luitpold, Prince Regent of Bavaria, for his wife and their children to be granted the hereditary title of Count and Countesses de Hohenfelsen with a coat of arms. With the assassination of his brother Sergei in February 1905, Grand Duke Paul was allowed to return to Russia for the funeral, but Olga was denied entrance that April to attend the promotion of her son Alexander Pistohlkors as an army officer. Paul claimed the custody of Marie and Dmitri, but the Tsar made Elizabeth their guardian. From then on, Grand Duke Paul was allowed to visit his children from his first marriage, but not to return to Russia permanently with his second wife. On 5 December that same year, Grand Duke Paul and Olga had another daughter, Natalia, completing their family.

Although an outcast to the Romanovs, Grand Duke Paul had a happy life in Paris with Olga and their three children. They employed a household staff of sixteen maids, gardeners, cooks, and tutors and they were art and porcelain collectors. At their mansion in Boulogne-sur-Seine, they gave dinners and receptions entertaining writers, artists and Russians abroad. The couple was very close to their three children, and on Sundays, the whole family attended private mass at the Russian church on rue Daru.

Although he was not consulted in the engagement of his daughter Grand Duchess Maria Pavlovna to Prince Wilhelm of Sweden, Paul attended the wedding on 3 May [O.S. 20 April] 1908. That same year, Grand Duke Paul, Olga and their three children visited Russia together for the first time. Shortly after, they returned to Paris but their son, Vladimir, stayed in Russia and became a student in the Corps des Pages. In 1912, on the occasion of Dmitri reaching his majority, Tsar Nicholas II finally relented and pardoned his only surviving uncle, restoring Grand Duke Paul's titles and privileges. He also recognized as valid Paul's second marriage. However, Grand Duke Paul decided to remain living in France. In 1913, Paul visited Russia, once again, to take part in the celebration of the Romanov Tercentenary. Grand Duke Paul moved back permanently to Russia only when he finished a house for himself and his family at Tsarskoe Selo in May 1914.

== World War I ==
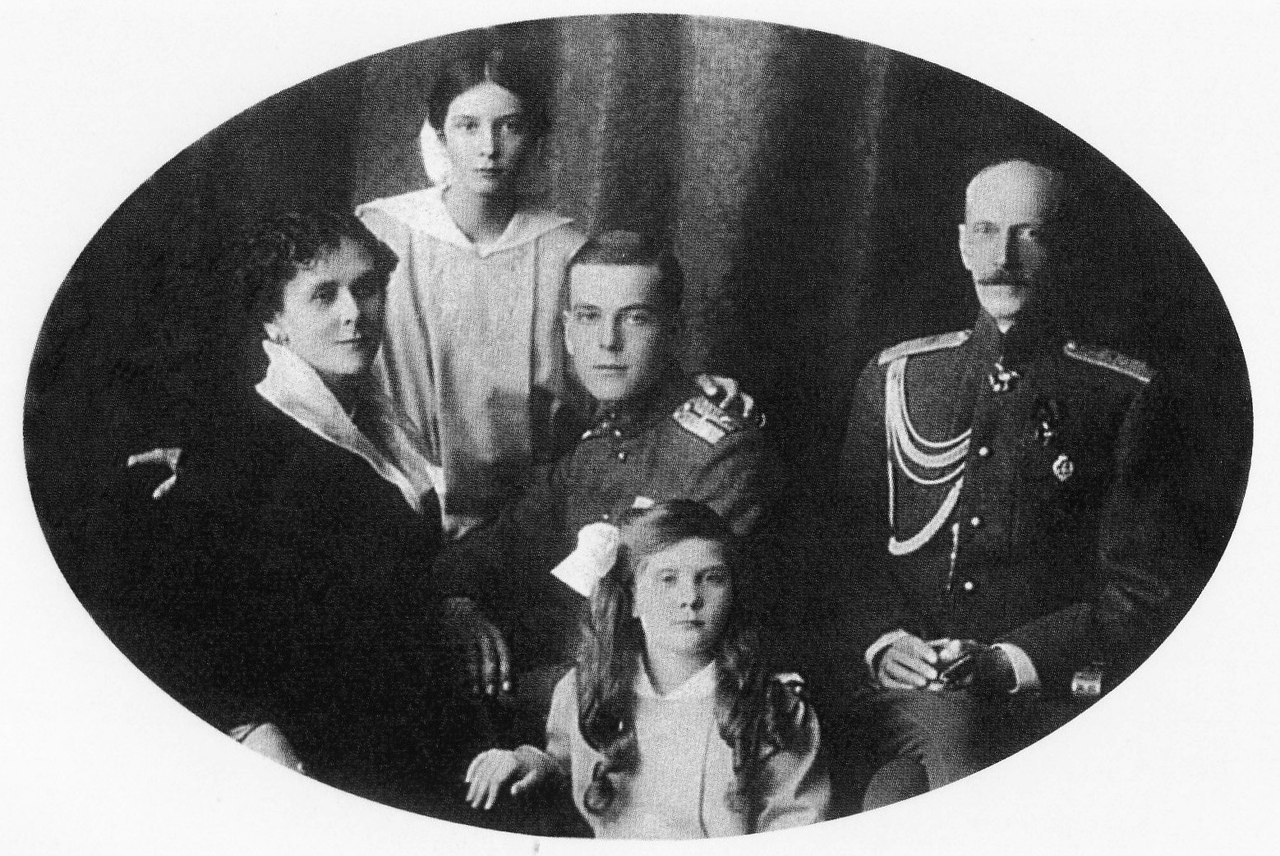
Grand Duke Paul Alexandrovich and his second family. From left to right: Princess Olga Paley, Princess Irina Paley, Prince Vladimir Paley, Princess Natalia Paley, and Grand Duke Paul Alexandrovich, 1916.

At the out break of World War I, Grand Duke Paul Alexandrovich's two sons, Dmitri and Vladimir, joined the war effort and his daughter, Grand Duchess Maria Pavlovna, became an army nurse. In August 1915, the Tsar granted Paul's wife, Olga, the title of Princess Paley with the style of Serene Highness, and their children also became Prince Vladimir Pavlovich Paley and Princesses Irina Pavlovna and Natalia Pavlovna Paley. In the same month, Prince Vladimir Paley joined a regiment. Although he had been away from active service for many years and his health was frail, Grand Duke Paul begged his nephew, Tsar Nicholas II, to give him an active military appointment on the battlefield. By that time, Paul was, once again, one of the few members of the extended Romanov family on good terms with the Empress Alexandra Feodorovna. Through her intervention, Nicholas II placed Paul in command of the First Corps of the Imperial Guard in 1915. However, before he could assume his military appointment, Paul felt gravely ill with gall bladder trouble. It was feared that he had cancer and he spent the fall and the winter of 1915–1916 ill. It was only after he recovered many months later, in May 1916, that Grand Duke Paul, ignoring his doctor's advice, left to take command of the 1st Guards Corps. He served with the rank of General of Cavalry. After a difficult spell at the front under heavy enemy bombardment at the village of Sokoul, he was awarded a St George's Cross 4th class, one of the most coveted military decorations. Due to his bad health, the grand duke was moved, in September 1916, to a new appointment as inspector general of the Guard at the Tsar's headquarters and his son, Vladimir, was placed under his orders.

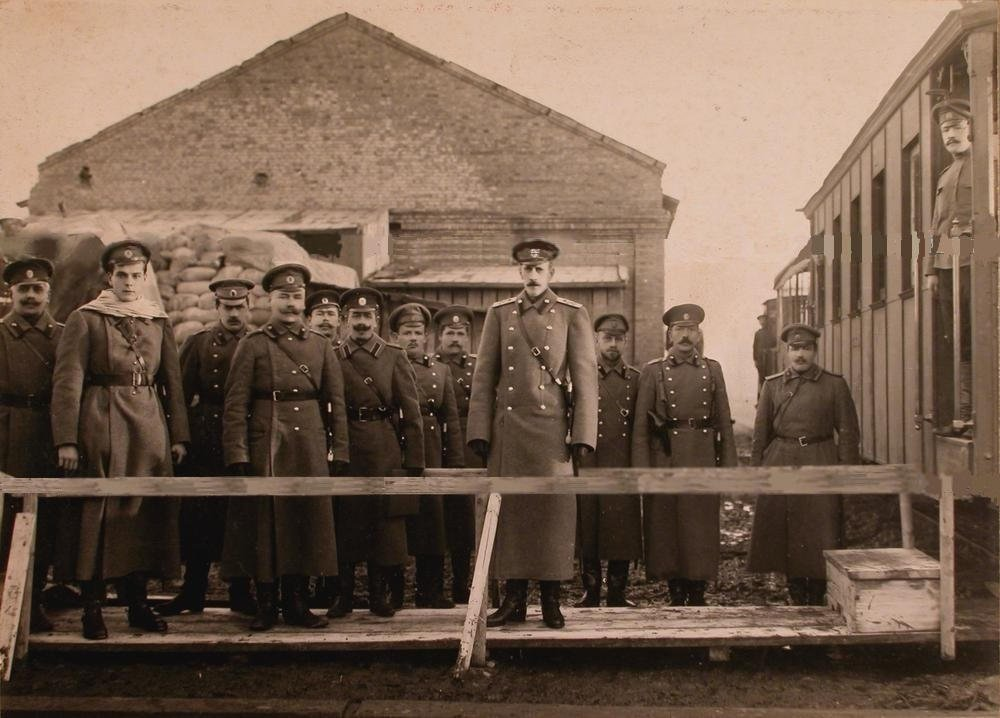
Grand Duke Paul Alexandrovich (the tallest man in the group) and his son, Vladimir (the young man without mustache), during the war

In the autumn of 1916, Paul took a three-week holiday in Crimea with his wife and children. On his way back north, in November, he visited the Dowager Empress Maria Feodorovna in Kiev. Maria Feodorovna and her son-in-law, Grand Duke Alexander Mikhailovich, enlisted Paul's help in order to persuade Nicholas II and his wife of the need for change and to get rid of Rasputin's damaging influence. Grand Duke Paul had an audience with the Tsar and Tsarina in December. He handled the issue with tact, but without success. Nevertheless, he was able to retain Nicholas II and Alexandra's confidence even after it was shaken with Paul's son Dmitri's involvement in Rasputin's murder in the early hours of 30 December [O.S. 17 December] 1916. Paul, who was at Stavka with Nicholas II when both received news of the event, was horrified of his son's participation in the murder. The Grand Duke supported his son and wrote a letter to the Tsar asking for clemency for Dmitri. Nevertheless, after spending some time under house arrest, Dmitri was sent to the Persian front as a form of exile.

On 28 February [O.S. 15 February] 1917, Alexandra summoned Paul and asked him to go to the front and gather some troops to save the throne. He declined, convinced that it was going to be a fruitless endeavor. Instead, with the assistance of Prince Michael Putiatin and the lawyer Nicholas Ivanov, Grand Duke Paul drafted a manifesto introducing the idea of a constitutional monarchy with Nicholas II remaining as an Emperor. It was signed by Paul, Grand Duke Michael Alexandrovich and Grand Duke Kirill Vladimirovich, the three most senior grand dukes in the last period of Imperial Russia. The manifesto was then delivered to the Duma to be presented for the Tsar's signature on March 1, at Nicholas II's return from headquarters. However, before that, the Tsar's train was held up and Nicholas II abdicated on 2 March. It fell upon Grand Duke Paul to inform Alexandra of Nicholas II's abdication on 3 March.

== Revolution ==
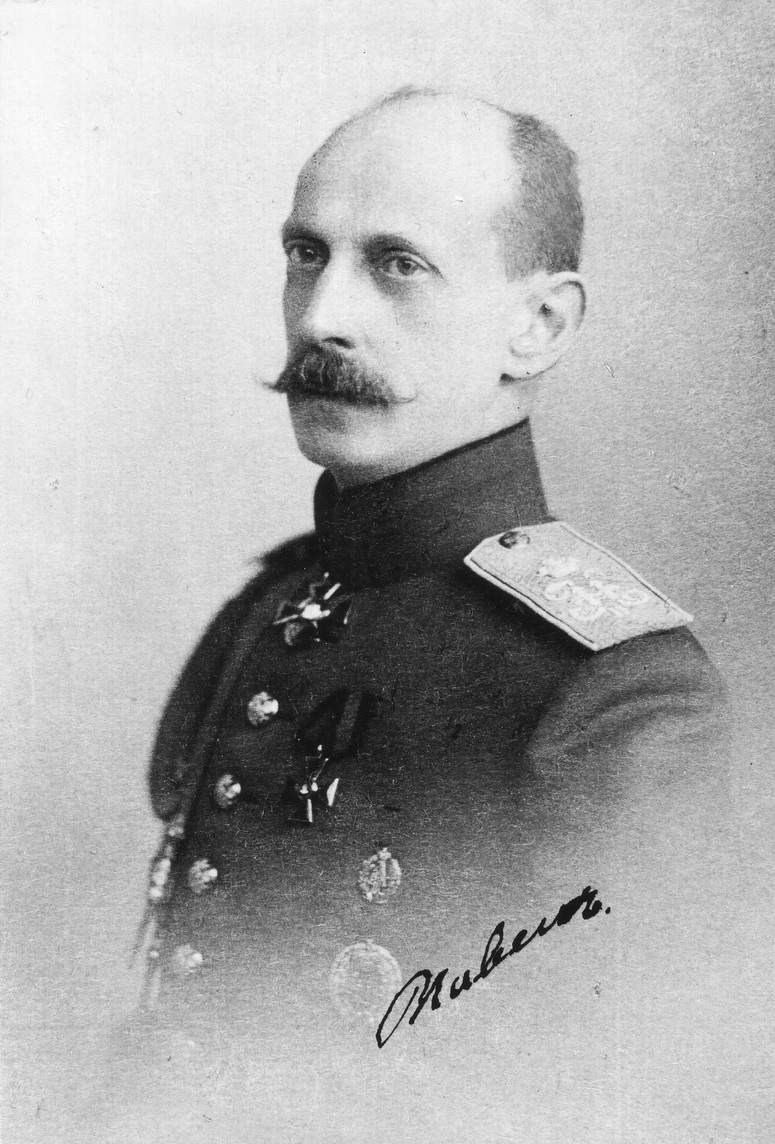
Grand Duke Paul Alexandrovich

At the fall of the Russian monarchy in March 1917, Grand Duke Paul, his wife, and their children remained united living at their luxurious estate in Tsarkoe Selo amid the upheaval. As Tsar Nicholas II and his family were sent to internal exile in Siberia, the Provisional Government, led by Alexander Kerensky, placed Paul under house arrest on 9 September [O.S. 27 August]. His telephone line was cut and a squad of soldiers guarded all the exits to his home. Through the intervention of his daughter, Grand Duchess Maria Pavlovna of Russia, whose second wedding he was not able to attend, the guards in charge of overseeing his house were removed.

The lives of the Romanovs deteriorated sharply after the Bolsheviks rose to power in October 1917. On 13 November [O.S. 31 October], Grand Duke Paul's house was ransacked and his firearms collection was taken away. Paul was arrested and held for two weeks at the Bolsheviks' headquarters in the Smolny Institute. He was going to be incarcerated at the Peter and Paul Fortress, but the Grand Duke protested. He was treated well by his captors, who addressed him as "Comrade Highness". Due to his frail health, he was released and returned to live in Tsarskoe Selo with his family.

The Bolshevik Government confiscated all property held by the banks on 27 December. Grand Duke Paul, who had deposited all the jewelry he had inherited from his parents in the banks, under his wife's name, lost all his fortune.

By early January 1918, Grand Duke Paul and his family could no longer afford to heat their large Tsarskoe Selo palace and they were forced to move to a nearby English dacha that belonged to his nephew, Grand Duke Boris Vladimirovich. Shortly after they moved out, their home was expropriated and turned into a museum, while Lenin himself rode in their car.

In March 1918, all male members of the Romanov family, including Paul's son, Vladimir, were ordered to register at Cheka headquarters and shortly after they were sent away into internal Russian exile. They never saw Vladimir again. He was murdered by the Bolsheviks, along with several other Romanov relatives, on 18 July 1918 in a mine shaft near Alapayevsk, one day after the murder of Tsar Nicholas II and his immediate family at Yekaterinburg. Grand Duke Paul, who was too ill to travel, initially escaped the fate of his son. Although under constant harassment, Grand Duke Paul continued living a simple life with his wife and their two daughters at Grand Duke Boris's dacha. It was difficult to find provisions, but as the Grand Duke suffered from a stomach ulcer, he was kept on a strict diet.

On 2 August [O.S. 20 July] 1918, Grand Duchess Maria Pavlovna came to say farewell to her father. She and her husband, Prince Sergei Putiatin, fled Russia through Ukraine. A week later, Grand Duke Paul was offered, through the Danish Ambassador, Harald Scavenius, to be smuggled out of the country and taken to Vienna wearing an Austrian uniform with a convoy of returning prisoners of war. The Grand Duke flatly refused, preferring to die rather than put on an enemy uniform.

== Murder ==
Determined to round up the last Grand Dukes remaining on Russian soil, the Bolsheviks arrested Grand Duke Paul at 3 a.m. on 13 August [O.S. 31 July] 1918. He was taken to the local Soviet, housed in Grand Duke Vladimir's Tsarkoe Selo villa. The next morning, he was sent to Spalernaia prison, where he would remain for most of his incarceration. His cousins, Grand Dukes Dimitri Konstantinovich, Nicholas Mikhailovich and George Mikhailovich, were already imprisoned there.

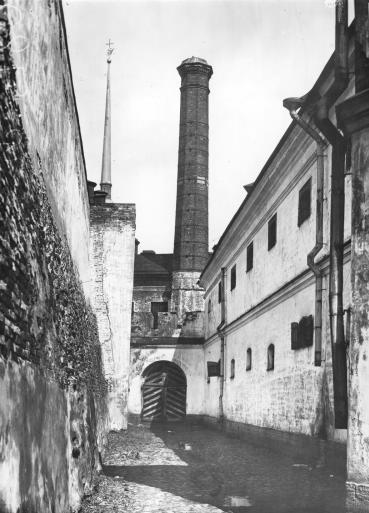
Trubetskoy bastion, St. Peter and St. Paul Fortress, outside courtyard, 1920

The four Grand Dukes, all men in their fifties, each had their own cell, 7 feet (2.1 m) by 3 feet (0.91 m). Their days began at 7 a.m., when they were awakened by the steps in the hall of their jailers and the clank of their keys in the door. Lunch was served at noon, which consisted of dirty hot water with a few fish bones in it and black bread. The lights were turned on in the cells at 7 p.m., although as the winter approached, the prisoners had to sit in darkness until that time.

During the short time they were given to exercise, the Grand Dukes were able to exchange a few words. Paul's wife was allowed to visit him twice a week, staying from 1 p.m. to 6 p.m. She did all she could to have him released. Queen Alexandrine of Denmark, a niece of Grand Dukes Nicholas and George Mikahilovich, tried unsuccessfully to obtain the release of her Romanov relatives through the intervention of Harald Scavenius, the Danish Minister in Petrograd.

On 6 December, as the Grand Duke's health, already bad, declined sharply, he was transferred to the prison hospital on the island of Goloday. Before he left, he was allowed to say goodbye to his young daughters, Irina and Natalia. Shortly afterwards, Princess Paley arranged for the two girls to be smuggled into Finland. They never saw their father again.

On Christmas Day, according to the old calendar, Princess Paley arrived at the hospital as usual to see her husband and bring him food. There was a new director, and the Princess was treated roughly. She was allowed to see her husband only briefly. It was their last time together. Princess Paley continued making desperate attempts to have her husband released through the intervention of Maxim Gorky.

On 9 January 1919 the Presidium of the Cheka in a meeting was attended by Martin Latsis, Yakov Peters, Ivan Ksenofontov and Secretary Murnek issued a resolution: "The Cheka's verdict against the persons of the former imperial pack – to approve, informing the Central Executive Committee".

On 27 January 1919, Grand Duke Paul was taken to Cheka headquarters and then transferred to another prison, Gorochovaia. He was kept there until 10 p.m., when he was driven to the St. Peter and St. Paul Fortress. Paul's three cousins, Grand Dukes Nicholas Michailovich, George Michailovich and Dimitri Constantinovich, were taken there directly from Spalernaia prison. The four Grand Dukes were then locked up in the dungeons of Troubetskoy Bastion. All four were to be shot early the next morning as hostages in response to the murders of Karl Liebknecht and Rosa Luxemburg in Germany.

At 3 a.m. on the following day, the four Grand Dukes were taken outside the fortress and stripped to the waist, despite the fact that it was almost −20 °C (−4 °F). His three cousins were each escorted, with a soldier on each side, towards a trench that had been dug in the courtyard. The fusillade of shots sent them reeling into the trench, joining thirteen other bodies in the mass grave. Grand Duke Paul, who was too emaciated and too sick to stand, was carried on a stretcher. Before he was murdered, he was heard saying «Lord, forgive them, for they do not know what they are doing». He was killed shortly afterwards.

Grand Dukes Paul, Michael, George and Dmitri were buried in a mass grave in the Fortress, the Bolsheviks having refused the distraught Princess Paley the right to bury her husband. On 31 January 1919, The Petrograd Pravda published the news about the murder of the four Grand Dukes.

In 1981, Grand Duke Paul was canonized by the Russian Orthodox Church Abroad as a holy martyr. In 1999, he was rehabilitated by the Prosecutor General's Office of Russia.
