= Sievers =

Sievers (German pronunciation: [ˈziːvɐs]) is a surname. Notable people with the surname include:

- Any member of the Sievers family
- Anthony John "Tony" Sievers, Australian politician
- Bryan Sievers (born 1959), American politician
- Burkhard Sievers (born 1968), German physician and entrepreneur
- Christian Sievers (born 1969), German journalist and television presenter
- Eduard Sievers (1850–1932), German philologist
- Eduard Wilhelm Sievers (1820–1894), German Shakespeare scholar
- Emanuel von Sievers (1817-1909), Baltic German aristocrat, senator and grand master of the Russian imperial court
- Eric Sievers (born 1957), American professional football player
- Frederick William Sievers (1872–1966), American sculptor
- Heather Sievers, American politician
- Henry Sievers (1874–?), American assistant printer, trade union activist and liquor store operator
- Hugo K. Sievers (1903–1972), Chilean scientist from a Hamburg merchant family
- Jacob von Sievers (1731–1808), Baltic German statesman from the Sievers family
- Jan-André Sievers (born 1987), German footballer
- Jan-Ole Sievers (born 1995), German football goalkeeper
- Johann August Carl Sievers (1762–1795), German-born botanist
- Jörg Sievers (born 1965), German footballer
- Karl-Heinz Sievers (born 1942), German long-distance runner
- Kay Sievers, German software engineer and developer of the udev device manager of Linux
- Leroy Sievers (1955–2008), American journalist
- Marie von Sievers (1867–1948), second wife of Rudolf Steiner and one of his closest colleagues
- Mark Sievers (born 1968), American convicted murderer
- Max Sievers (1887–1944), chairman of the German Freethinkers' League
- Morris Sievers (1912–1968), Australian cricketer
- Peter von Sievers (1674–1740), Russian admiral
- Ralf Sievers (born 1961), former German football player
- Roy Sievers (1926–2017), American baseball player
- Sampson Sievers (1900–1979), Russian Orthodox Christian elder
- Teresa Sievers (1968–2015), American doctor and murder victim
- Thadeus von Sievers (1853–?), Baltic German general of the Imperial Russian Army
- Todd Sievers (born 1980), former American football placekicker
- Walther Sievers, German Commander of the III./Infanterie-Regiment 415, Knight's Cross of the Iron Cross received on 19 December 1942
- Wilhelm Sievers (1860–1921), German geographer and geologist
- Wolfgang Sievers (1913–2007), Australian photographer
- Wolfram Sievers (1905–1948), German Holocaust perpetrator and manager of the Ahnenerbe, executed for war crimes

== See also ==
- Seevers, a surname
- Siever, a surname
- Siewierz, a town in the Silesian Voivodeship in Poland
- Sivers (disambiguation)
