= Seevers =

Seevers is a surname of German origin.

Notable people with the surname include:

- E. E. Seevers (1862–1927), American politician
- Greg Seevers (born 1965), American stock car racing driver
- Paul Seevers (born 1969), Irish hurler
- William H. Seevers (1820–1895), American judge

== See also ==
- Sievers, German surname
