= Nikolai Putyatin =

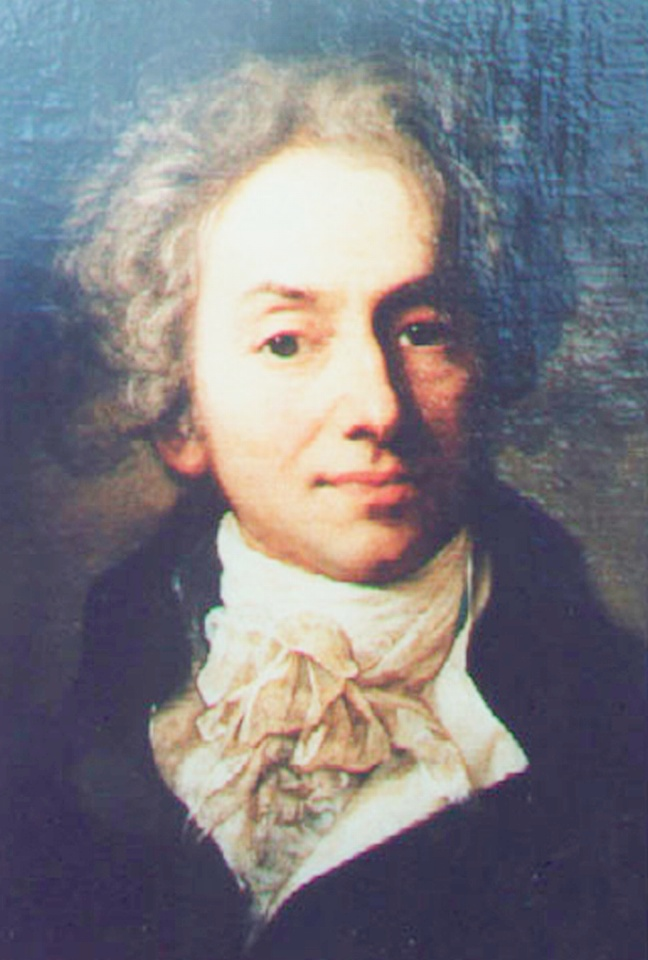
Nikolai Abramowitsch Fürst Putjatin

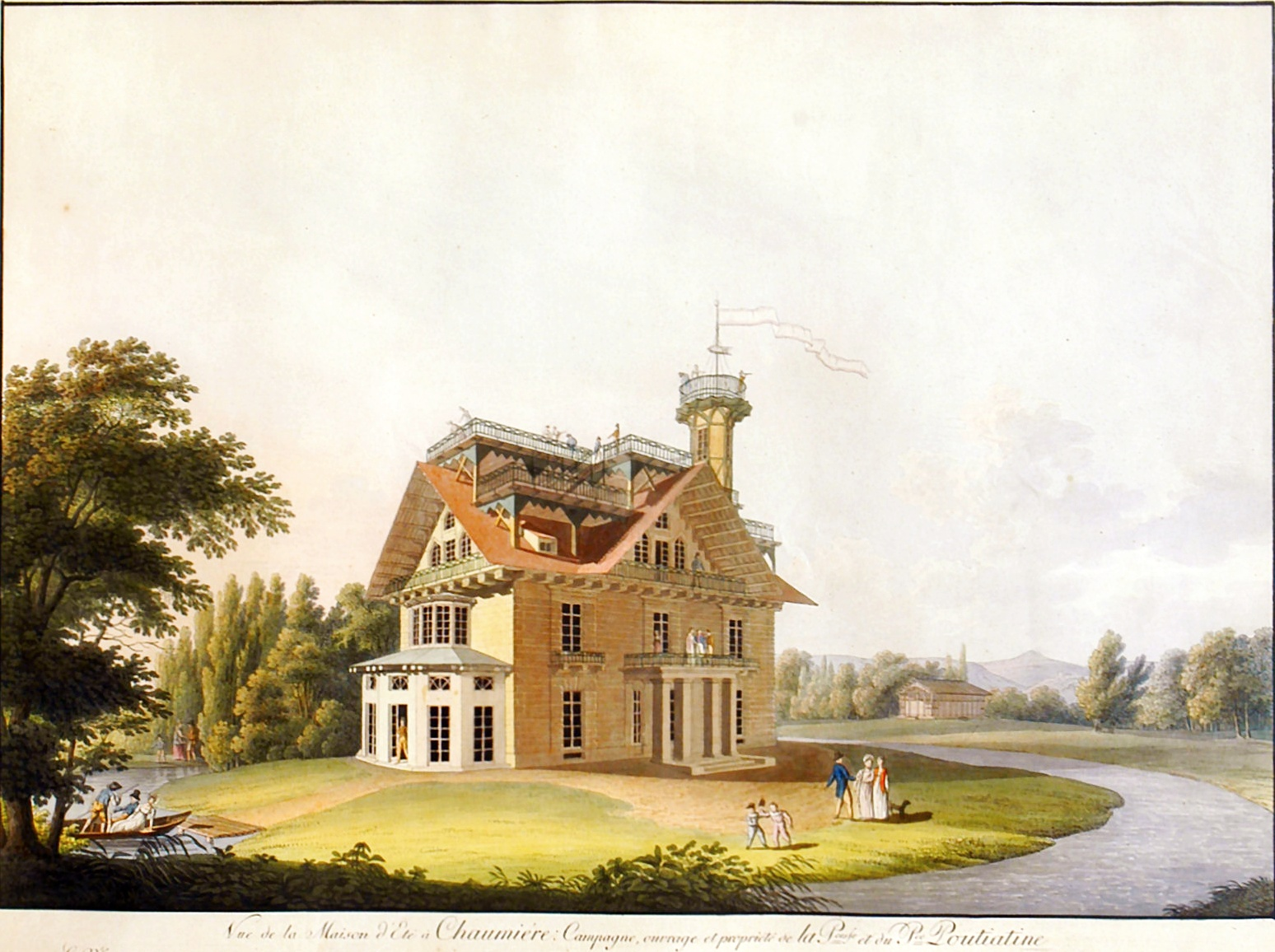
Putjatinsche Landhaus 1811

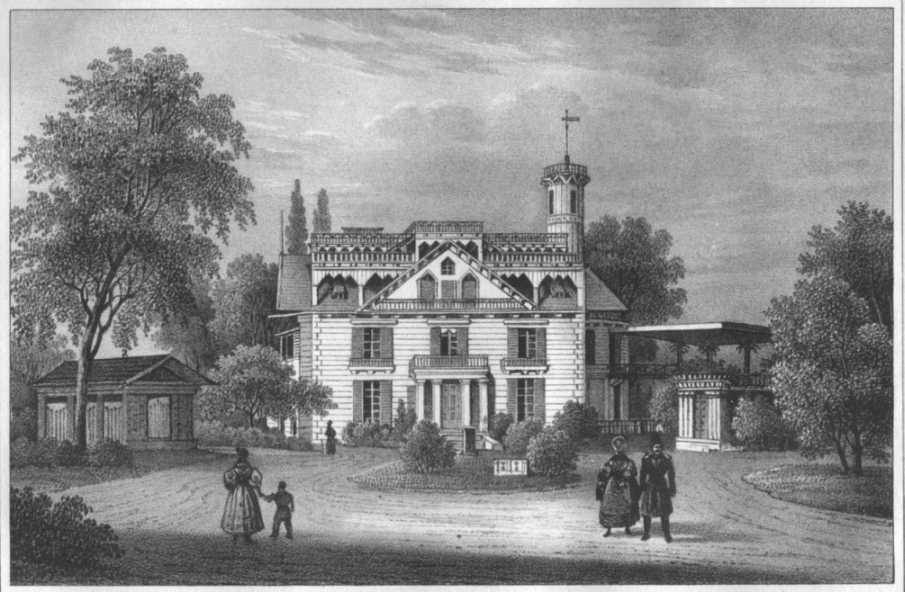
Putjatinsche Landhaus 1837

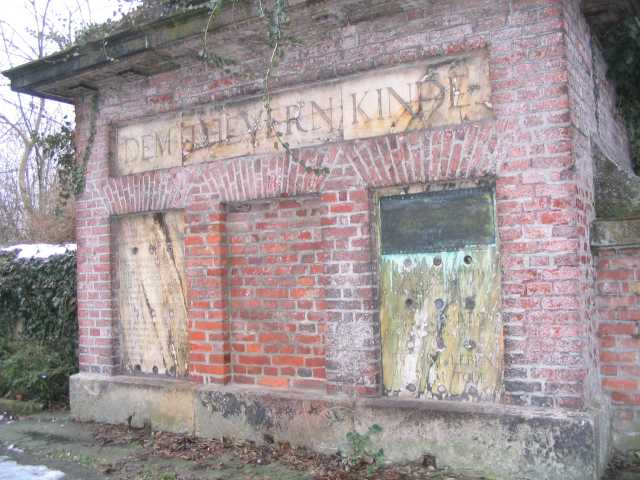
Mausoleum

Prince Nikolai Abramovich Putyatin (Russian: Николай Абрамович Путятин), also romanized Putiatin, Puttiatin or Poutiatine (16 May 1749 – 13 January 1830) was a philanthropist, philosopher, and eccentric personality from the House of Putyatin, a branch of Rurik dynasty.

== Life ==
Born in Kiev, Prince Putyatin joined the Russian army early in his life. After having to oversee a brutal punishment as an officer, he left the service. He learned about architecture and garden arts, and contributed to the Gardens of Tsarskoye Selo. His talent and technical skills earned him a supervising position for public buildings at the court in Saint Petersburg. He was later promoted to Kammerherr and Geheimrat at the imperial court.

There he met and fell in love with Elisabeth von Sievers, the daughter of the court's chamberlain Karl von Sievers. Her husband was the influential Russian governor Jacob Johann von Sievers, a relative and protégé of her father. The long-lasting love affair culminated in 1778 into a scandal at the court, followed by her divorce and marriage to Putyatin.

Elisabeth von Sievers had three daughters: Cathinca (born 1770), Benedicta (born 1773) and Elisabeth (born 1776). Her divorce allowed her only to keep Benedicta with her. It is likely that the new couple had to commit to keep the new marriage free of new children, as new legitimate heirs would have endangered the heritage of the two daughters, who remained with Jacob Johann von Sievers. The couple and Benedicta left the Russian court and traveled several years throughout Europe.

In 1797 the family settled in Kleinzschachwitz near Dresden. It was there, that the prince built, based on his own plans, his "Chaumière", an extravagant villa with 16 balconies, a minarett-like tower, many swings and a gondola in the gardens. The place with its highly decorated park, full of grottos and ruins, was open to the public and known beyond the region.

Putyatin rests, along with his wife († 1818) and stepdaughter († 1799), in a self-designed mausoleum in Dessau. Considering the date of her birth and the loving poems dedicated to Benedicta, she could very well have been his (secret) daughter.

Putyatin's only heir was Gottlob Wassily von Freymann (born October 18, 1780, in St. Petersburg). Freymann was raised an orphan, supported by the prince. Among other things, Putyatin bought him the Rittergut Großzschachwitz, a noble seat close to the Chaumière. - The heritage was greatly reduced due to the earlier transfer of the mother's possessions to the daughters and gifts to the servants. The paperwork that Putyatin left behind, convinced Freymann that he was in fact the couple's son. Putyatin was unable to share this with him during his lifetime. The prince suffered greatly unter this, but felt bound by his word of honor.

Prince Putyatin is still remembered in Dresden as a generous, free thinking, lovable and eccentric personality. In 1997 a monument was dedicated to him in Kleinzschachwitz.

== Peculiarities ==
Putyatin was full of inventions and ideas. He equipped his coach with bellows to get some cool air in the summer. His sled had a built-in oven for the winter. He invented a sugar saw, used wooden masks for wind protection and extended his umbrella with sidewalls. He was also an early protagonist of nudism, and opposed to wearing pants. Putyatin was active in music and poetry, and known as an outspoken philosopher.

== Buildings ==
- Villa and park in Kleinzschachwitz
- School house in Kleinzschachwitz (today: „Putjatinhaus“)
- Playground (Play temple)
- Mausoleum in Dessau (at the "Neue Begräbnisplatz")

== Philosophical Work ==
- Worte aus dem Buche der Bücher, published by A. W. Tappe, Dresden 1824.

Putjatin was strongly opposed to modern French philosophers of his time such as Voltaire, Jean-Jacques Rousseau, Marquis de Condorcet, Denis Diderot, Jean le Rond d'Alembert and other French encyclopaedists. - He was in close contact with Karl Christian Friedrich Krause, and became a friend of Johann Gottfried Herder in his last year.

== Literature ==
- Wilhelm HOSÄUS, Fürst Putiatin, 1749–1830, in Mitteilungen des Vereins für Anhaltische Geschichte und Altertumskunde (MittVAGA)3, 1883, S. 461
- Pierer's Universal-Lexikon. Altenburg 41857-1865, Band 13, S. 707.
- Rudolph von Kyaw, Fürst Putjatin in Klein-Zschachwitz, Wissenschaftliche Beilage der Leipziger Zeitung, Nr.90, Sonntag 10. November 1878
- Rudolph von Kyaw, Fürst Putiatin, Ein Beitrag zur Geschichte von Klein-Zschachwitz, Dresden, Officin von Wilhelm Baensch, 1883.

Mentioned in

- Wilhelm von Kügelgen: Lebenserinnerungen eines alten Mannes available via Zelebritäten and Die Rückkehr des Königs
- Eckermann, J. P. "Gespräche mit Goethe". spiegel.de.
- Karl Ludwig Blum, Ein russischer Staatsmann, Denkwürdigkeiten des Grafen von Sievers, Leipzig 1857–58, 4 Bände
- Karl Ludwig Blum: Graf Jacob Johann von Sievers und Russland zu dessen Zeit. Leipzig; Heidelberg: Winter, 1864.
- Kai Wenzel und Marius Winzler (Herausgeber), Franz Gareis (1775–1803). Zum Maler geboren. Gemälde, Zeichnungen und Druckgrafik eines Wegbereiters der deutschen Romantik, Verlag Gunter Oettel, Görlitz 2003, ISBN 3-932693-81-7 (mit Porträts)
- Jürgen-Detlev Freiherr von Uexküll, Armeen und Amouren- Ein Tagebuch aus Napoleonischer Zeit von Boris Uexküll, Rowohlt Verlag, Reinbek 1965

== Material in archives ==
- Guest book of the villa and park and Worte aus dem Buch der Bücher in the state library in Dresden (SLUB Dresden)
- Family letters in the state archive in Detmold ("Nachlass Stietencron")
- Verlassenschaftsregelung in the city archive in Dresden (micro film)
- Personal folder in the city archive in Dessau (incl. newspaper articles)
