= Seaver =

Seaver is a surname, and may refer to:

- Benjamin Seaver (1795–1856), American politician from Massachusetts; mayor of Boston 1852–53
- Blanche Seaver (1891–1994), American philanthropist and musician
- Ebenezer Seaver (1763–1844), American politician from Massachusetts; U.S. representative 1803–1813
- Edwin Seaver (1900–1987), American publisher, writer, editor, critic
- Frank Seaver (1883–1964), American lawyer, Navy officer, oil executive, philanthropist
- Fred Jay Seaver (1877–1970), American mycologist
- Jay Webber Seaver (1855–1915), American physician and pioneer of anthropometry
- Kirsten Seaver (1934-) Norwegian-American historian
- Kristjan Seaver (1898–1941), Estonian Communist politician
- Michael Seaver (born 1967), Irish musician and dance critic
- Robert Chauncey Seaver (fl. 1907), American amateur tennis player
- Thomas O. Seaver (1833–1912), American army officer during the American Civil War; recipient of the Medal of Honor
- Tom Seaver (1944–2020), American baseball pitcher

== See also ==
- Siever, surname
