= Vera Sergeevna Plautina =

Russian noblewoman (1845–1925)

Countess Vera Sergeevna Plautina
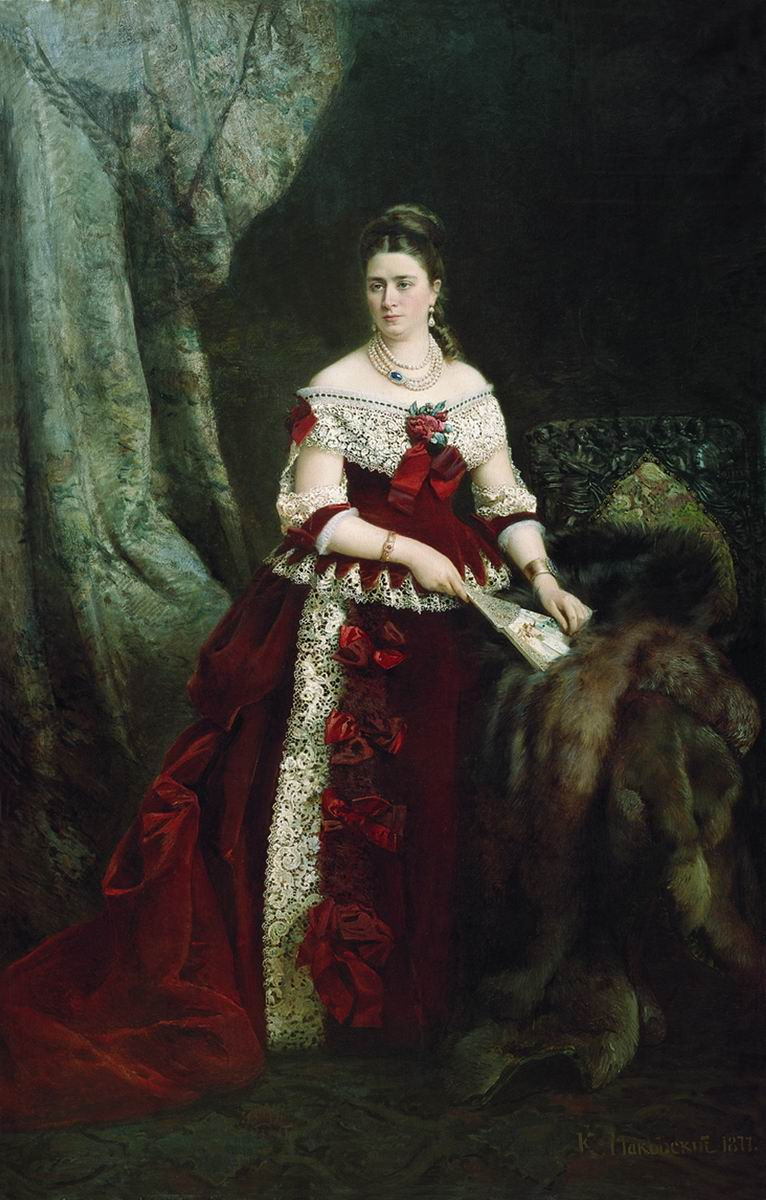
- Full name: Вера Сергеевна Плаутина
- Known for: Philanthropist, noblewoman
- Born: Platon Aleksandrovich Zubov; 1845; Russian Empire
- Died: 1925 (aged 79–80); Russian Empire
- Spouse: Platon Aleksandrovich Zubov
- Issue: 4, including Valentin

Countess Vera Sergeevna Zubova née. Plautina (1845–1925) was a Russian noblewoman and philanthropist. She married Platon Aleksandrovich Zubov in 1869.

She is descended from the tatar Ogareva family though her mother, Anna Platonovna Ogareva. She had a middle class upbringing due to her father, Sergei Fedorovich Plautin, developing a gambling addiction. Sergeevna Plautina had a total of four children.
