= Platon Aleksandrovich Zubov =

Russian philanthropist (1935–1890)

Count Platon Aleksandrovich Zubov
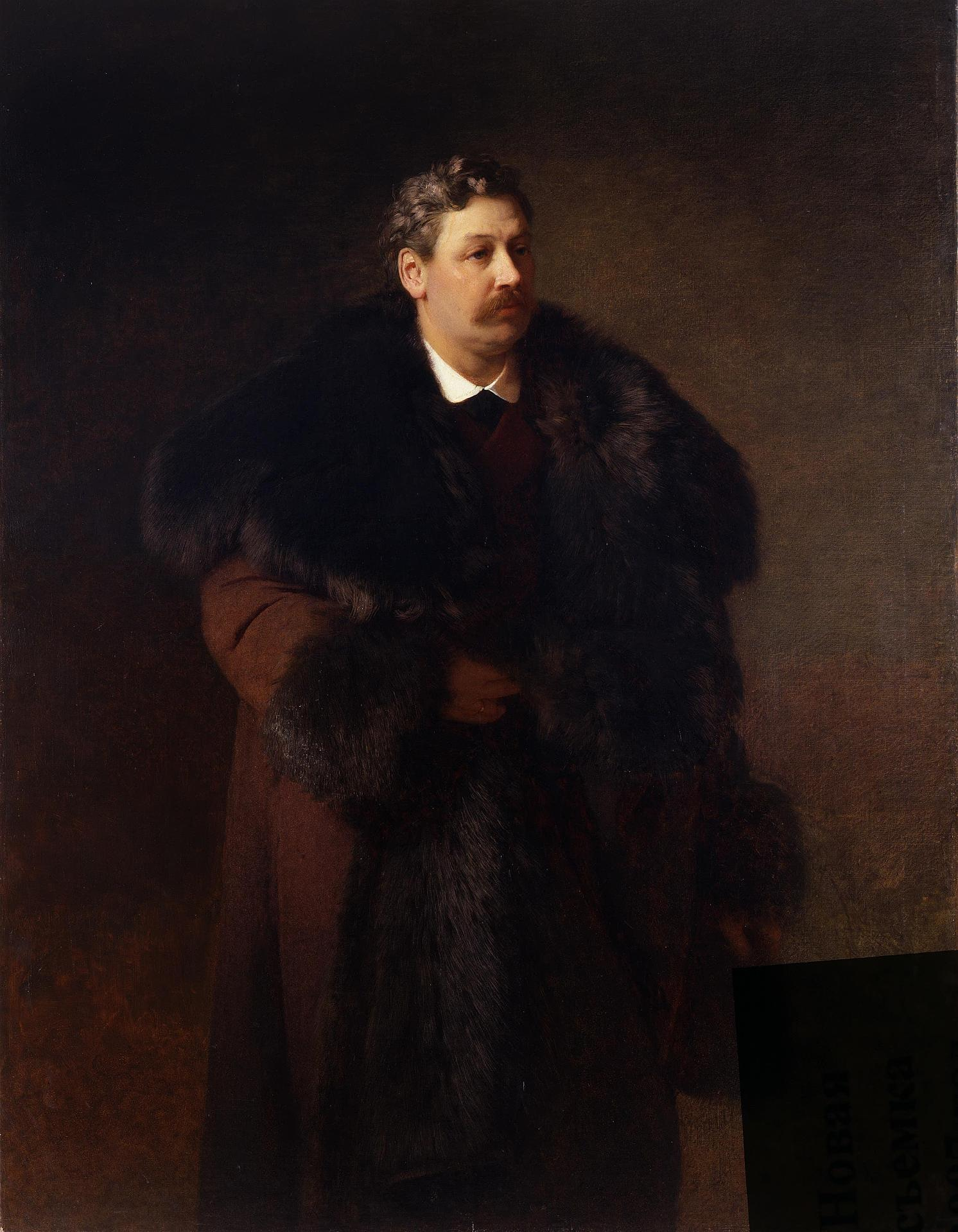
- Portrait by Johann Köler, 1873
- Full name: Платон Александрович Зубов
- Known for: Philanthropist, landowner
- Born: Platon Aleksandrovich Zubov; January 20, 1835; Saint Petersburg, Russian Empire
- Died: January 11, 1890 (aged 54); Saint Petersburg, Russian Empire
- Noble family: Zubov
- Spouse: Vera Sergeevna Plautina
- Issue: 4, including Valentin Zubov

Count Platon Aleksandrovich Zubov (January 8, 1835 – January 11, 1890) was a Russian Privy councilor, philanthropist, landowner descended from the Zubov and Suvorov families.

Born in St. Petersburg, Platon Zubov took part in the Crimean War as part of the Kazan Jaeger Regiment where he fought at the Battle of Alma, and during the siege of Sevastopol. Count Platon Alexandrovich, who owned a substantial fortune (Zubov alone had over 56.8 thousand hectares of land), was actively engaged in charitable activities. From 1868 to 1871, he served as a trustee of the House of the Poor under the Imperial Philanthropic Society. From 1871 to 1890, he was a trustee of the Ivanovo Girls' School, for which he donated 2,000 rubles annually and bequeathed a capital of 30,000 rubles. With Zubov's funds, the school's building was also rebuilt and expanded.

He married Vera Sergeevna Plautina in 1869.
