= Sivers =

Sivers may refer to:

== People ==
- Fanny de Sivers (1920–2011), Estonian linguist
- Malou von Sivers (born 1953), Swedish journalist
- Marie Steiner-von Sivers (1867–1948), Polish anthroposophist
- Rudolf Sivers (1892–1918), Russian revolutionary

== Places ==
- Lake Sivers, a lake in Latvia

== See also ==
- Sievers
