= Grand Duchess Maria Pavlovna of Russia (1890–1958) =

Grand Duchess of Russia

Grand Duchess Maria Pavlovna
- Duchess of Södermanland; Princess Sergei Mikhailovich Putyatin
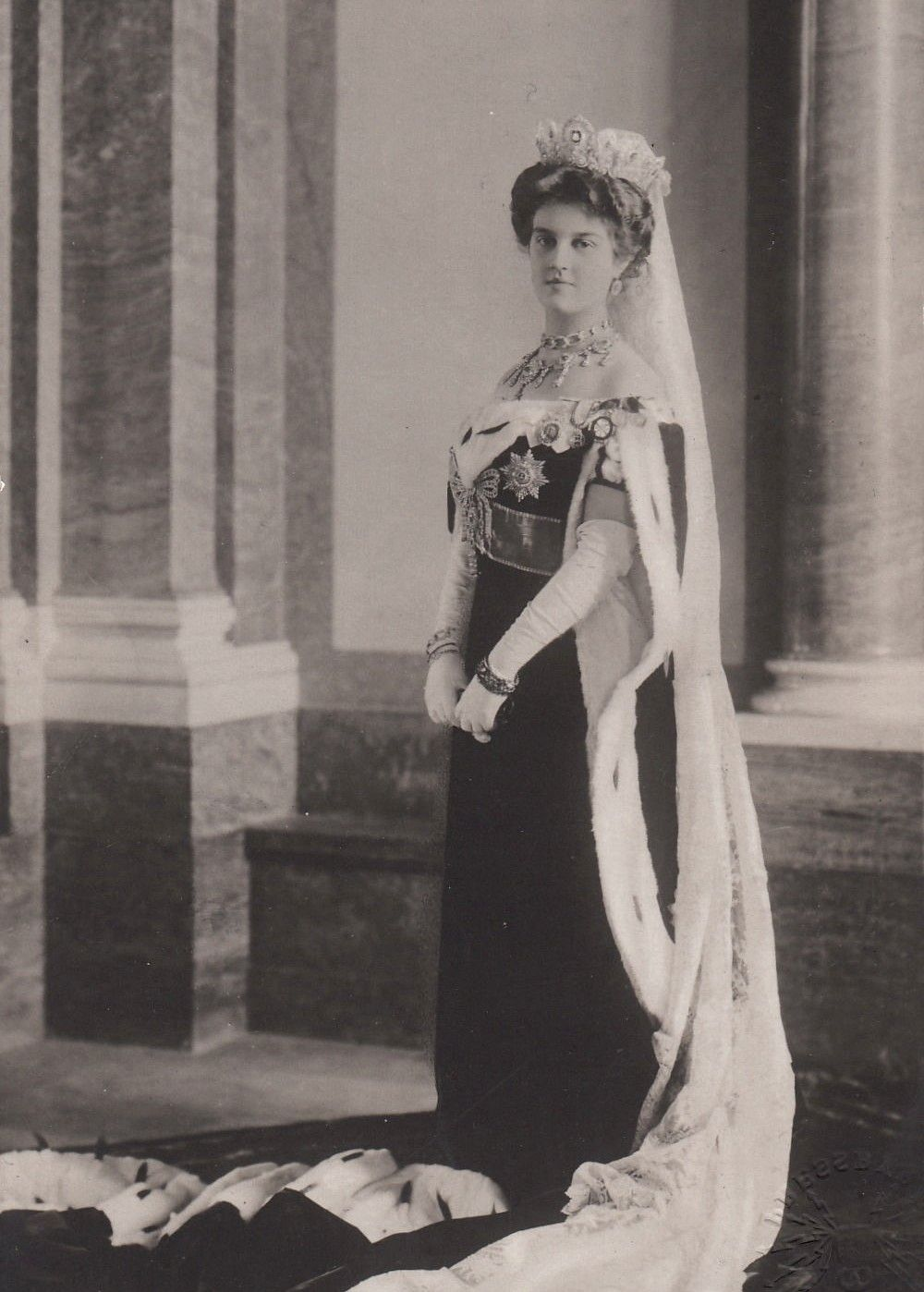
- Maria Pavlovna in 1908
- Born: 18 April 1890; Saint Petersburg, Russian Empire
- Died: 13 December 1958 (aged 68); Mainau, Konstanz, Baden-Württemberg, West Germany
- Spouse: Prince Wilhelm, Duke of Södermanland (m. 1908; div. 1914) Prince Sergei Mikhailovich Putyatin (m. 1917; div. 1923)
- Issue: Count Lennart Bernadotte of Wisborg; Prince Roman Sergeievich Putyatin
- House: Holstein-Gottorp-Romanov
- Father: Grand Duke Paul Alexandrovich of Russia
- Mother: Princess Alexandra of Greece and Denmark

Grand Duchess Maria Pavlovna of Russia (Russian: Великая Княгиня Мария Павловна; 18 April [O.S. 6 April] 1890 – 13 December 1958), known as Maria Pavlovna the Younger, was a granddaughter of Alexander II of Russia. She was a paternal first cousin of Nicholas II (Russia's last Tsar) and Marie of Edinburgh (consort of Ferdinand I of Romania) and maternal first cousin of George II, Alexander, and Paul (all kings of Greece), Helen of Greece and Denmark (second wife of Carol II of Romania), and Prince Philip, Duke of Edinburgh (consort of Elizabeth II).

Her early life was marked by the death of her mother and her father's banishment from Russia when he remarried a commoner in 1902. Grand Duchess Maria and her younger brother Dmitri, to whom she remained very close throughout her life, were raised in Moscow by their paternal uncle Grand Duke Sergei Alexandrovich and his wife Grand Duchess Elizabeth Feodorovna of Russia, a granddaughter of Queen Victoria.

In 1908, Maria Pavlovna married Prince Wilhelm, Duke of Södermanland. The couple had one son, Prince Lennart, Duke of Småland, later Count Bernadotte af Wisborg. The marriage was unhappy and ended in divorce in 1914. During World War I, Grand Duchess Maria Pavlovna served as a nurse until the fall of the Russian monarchy in February 1917. In September 1917, during the period of the Russian Provisional Government, she married Prince Sergei Putyatin. They had a son, Prince Roman Sergeievich Putyatin, who died in infancy. The couple escaped revolutionary Russia through Ukraine in July 1918.

In exile, Grand Duchess Maria Pavlovna lived briefly in Bucharest and London, then she settled in Paris in 1920. In the 1920s, she opened Kitmir, an embroidering fashion atelier that achieved some level of success. In 1923, she divorced her second husband, and after selling Kitmir in 1928, she emigrated to the United States. While living in New York City, she published two books of memoirs: The Education of a Princess (1930), and A Princess in Exile (1932).

In 1942, Grand Duchess Maria Pavlovna moved to Argentina where she spent the years of World War II. She returned permanently to Europe in 1949. She died in Konstanz, Germany in 1958.

== Early life ==
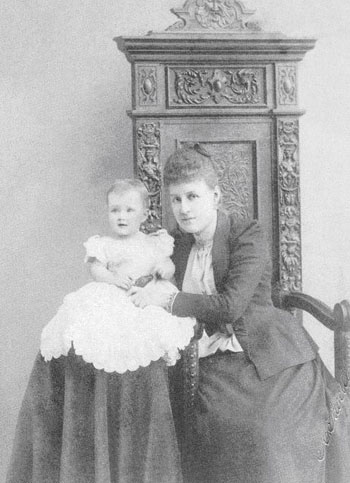
Maria Pavlovna with her mother

Grand Duchess Maria Pavlovna was born 18 April [O.S. 6 April] 1890 in Saint Petersburg. She was the first child and only daughter of Grand Duke Paul Alexandrovich of Russia and his first wife, Grand Duchess Alexandra Georgievna of Russia, born Princess Alexandra of Greece and Denmark. The baby was named after her late paternal grandmother, the Empress Maria Alexandrovna, and her paternal aunt, maternal grandaunt, and godmother, the Empress Maria Feodorovna, and was known by the nickname "Marisha" Maria was not yet two years old when her mother died from complications after giving birth to Maria's younger brother, Grand Duke Dmitri Pavlovich of Russia in 1891. Grand Duke Paul was so distraught by the unexpected death of his young wife that he neglected his two small children, who were left in the care of his elder brother, Grand Duke Sergei Alexandrovich, who had no children of his own. Once he recovered emotionally, Grand Duke Paul took the two children away with him. A commander of the Imperial horse Guards, Grand Duke Paul loved his children, but as was customary at the time, he refrained from showing them spontaneous affection. Maria and her brother were raised by governesses and tutors, but they adored their father who visited them twice a day. The children spent Christmases and later some summer holidays with Grand Duke Sergei and his wife Grand Duchess Elisabeth Feodorovna. The couple set aside a playroom and bedrooms for the youngsters at their country home Ilinskoe.

Maria Pavlovna's childhood was spent in splendor. Her early memories were of magnificent palaces and lazy country estates populated by armies of servants. Until she was age 6, Maria spoke Russian badly as all of her governesses and the immediate family spoke English. Later she had another governess, Mademoiselle Hélène who taught her French and stayed with her until her marriage. At age 7, she traveled in her personal railway car accompanied by her governess to visit Germany and France. On Sundays, she and her brother were allowed to play with children from aristocratic families. Growing up without a mother and with a frequently absent father, Grand Duchess Maria and her brother Dimitri became very close, relying on each other for affection and companionship.

== Education ==
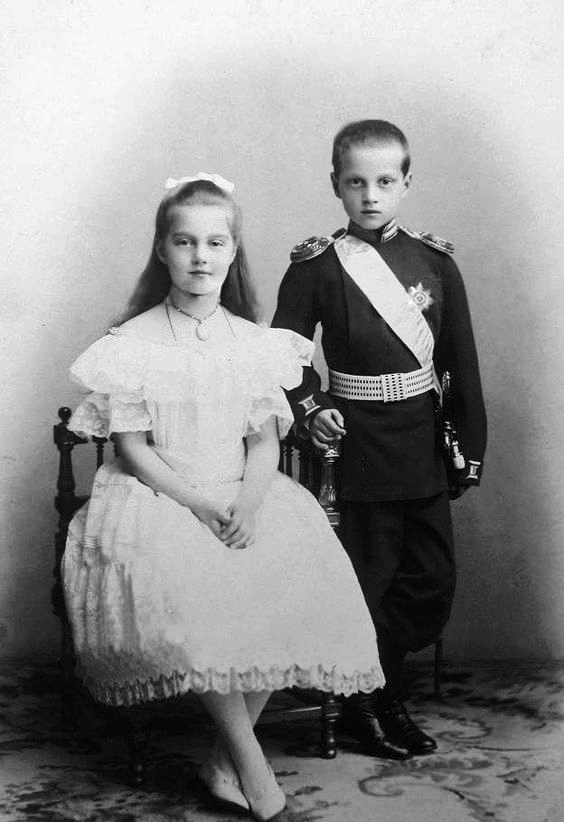
Grand Duchess Maria Pavlovna and her brother Grand Duke Dmitri Pavlovich

In 1895, Grand Duke Paul began an affair with Olga Valerianova von Pistolkors, a married woman. He was able to obtain a divorce for her, and he eventually married Olga in 1902 while the couple was staying abroad. As they had married by defying Nicholas II's opposition, the tsar forbade them to return to Russia. Left fatherless, 12-year-old Maria and 11-year-old Dmitri moved to Moscow placed under the custody of their uncle Grand Duke Sergei and his wife Grand Duchess Elisabeth Feodorovna, a sister of the Tsarina Alexandra. Maria and Dimitri resented their aunt and uncle, blaming them for the forced separation from their real father, who had abandoned them. Grand Duke Sergei was strict and demanding, but devoted and affectionate toward the children. Marie wrote in her memoirs: "In his fashion he loved us deeply. He liked to have us near him, and gave us a good deal of his time. But he was always jealous of us. If he had known the full extent of our devotion to our father it would have maddened him." Maria Pavlovna also commented that she could not entirely disagree with those who thought Grand Duke Sergei heartless, self-centered and cruel. Maria had a somewhat strained relationship with her aunt. Grand Duchess Elisabeth Feodorovna found it difficult to relate to the children, and she was cold and distant toward them. The teenage Maria was described by her maternal aunt Grand Duchess Maria Georgievna of Russia as "full of life and very jolly, but inclined to be self-willed and selfish, and rather difficult to deal with."

Grand Duke Sergei, who served as Governor General of Moscow, was a polarizing figure. Targeted by the SR Combat Organization, he was assassinated by a terrorist bomb at the Kremlin in February 1905. The bomber had refrained from an earlier attack because he saw that Grand Duchess Elisabeth, 15-year-old Maria, and her younger brother Dmitri were in the carriage, and he did not want to kill women and children. After the assassination of their uncle, both children were emotionally distraught, particularly Dmitri. Grand Duke Paul claimed the custody of his children, but the tsar made Elisabeth their guardian. Grand Duke Paul was allowed to visit them, but not to return to Russia permanently. After her husband's assassination, Grand Duchess Elisabeth Feodorovna regretted treating the children poorly, and she became closer to them.

== First marriage ==
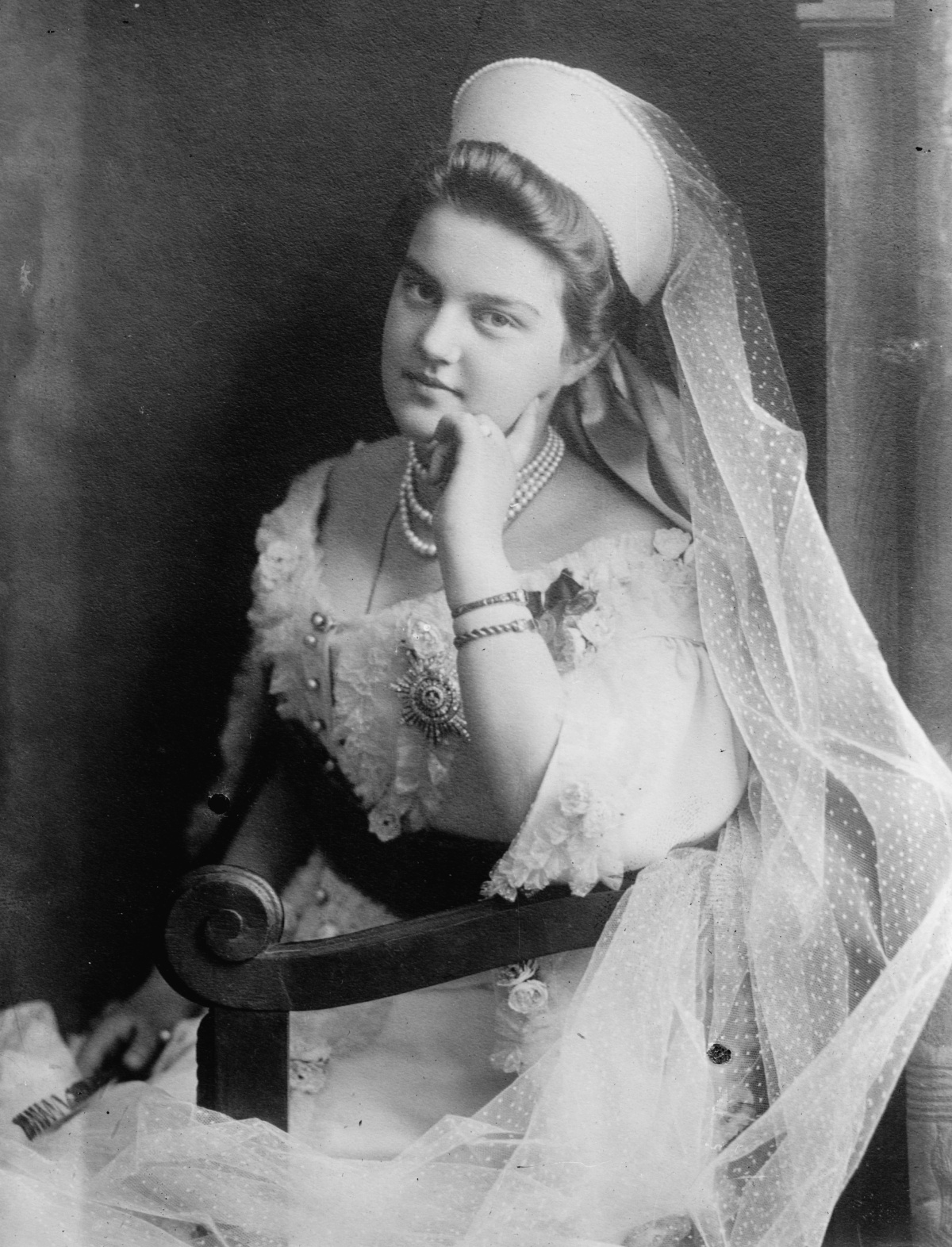
Grand Duchess Maria Pavlovna wearing the traditional dress of ladies of the Russian Imperial court

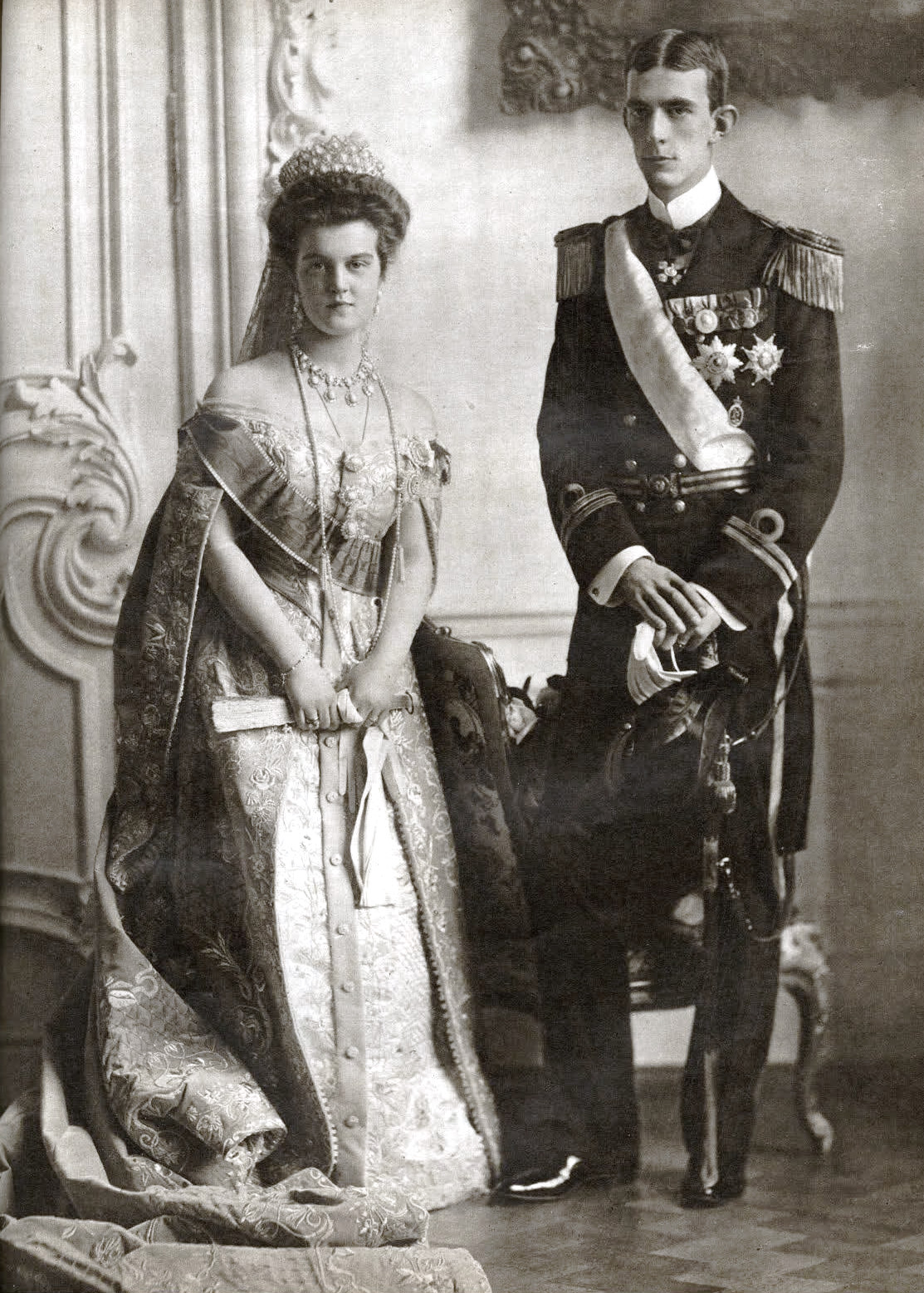
Maria Pavlovna and prince Wilhelm at the time of their marriage in 1908.

During the next two years, Maria's aunt turned toward religion and charity work. Planning to retire from court and to form a religious order, Grand Duchess Elisabeth decided to find a husband for her niece, along with the help of her cousin, Crown Princess Margaret of Sweden. Shortly after Easter 1907, Prince Wilhelm, Duke of Södermanland, the second son of King Gustav V of Sweden and Victoria of Baden, visited St Petersburg, and he was introduced to the 16-year-old Maria Pavlovna. She was plump, mischievous and proud. The prince was tall, thin, dark and distinguished looking "with beautiful grey eyes", Maria recalled. He stayed for dinner, and the following day, Maria was told that he wished to marry her. Pressed by her aunt to give a speedy answer, Maria agreed to the prince's proposal and found herself engaged to a man she had known for only few hours. The official betrothal was announced in June 1907 at Peterhof palace.

Maria Pavlovna wrote later that she felt her aunt had rushed her into the marriage. However, at the time, she enjoyed the attention, and she was eager to escape from the nursery. "Then we will be able to travel together," she wrote to Wilhelm after their engagement. "And to live just as we wish and to suit ourselves. I'm looking forward to a wonderful life – a life full of love and happiness, just as you described to me in your last letters."

The marriage had positive political and diplomatic implications for both Russia and Sweden, and Tsar Nicholas II gave his consent. Grand Duke Paul was not consulted. Contemporary newspaper reports suggest that Maria Pavlovna brought a large fortune to the marriage; as a Granddaughter of Tsar Alexander II, she was entitled to an annuity of 50,000 roubles prior to reaching the age of majority, and 100,000 roubles (approximately £10,500 in 1908) per year thereafter . As a Russian Grand Duchess, she also was reported to have received a dowry of 1,000,000 roubles upon her marriage, as well as a share in the estimated 8,000,000 rouble fortune left by her father upon his death.

From Peterhof, Maria Pavlovna went to Grand Duchess Elisabeth's rural estate Ilinskoe, near Moscow, where Wilhelm joined them for a month before he left on a cruise to the United States. The young couple maintained their intimacy through letters. Maria imagined herself in love: "It’s lovely to have somebody, even far away, who love you more than anything and whom you love more than everybody on earth“, she wrote to him. In October, Wilhelm returned to Russia joining Grand Duchess Maria and her brother Dimitri who introduced the Swedish prince to their father, Grand Duke Paul, who was permitted to come back to Russia for his daughter's wedding set to take place after she turned age 18 the next April. At Wilhelm's departure, Maria wrote to him: " I love you, so much with every day, every hour more and more. I wish it were April now, how lovely it would be". In her book of memoirs, written more than 20 years later, the grand duchess made different claims: "I was using Wilhelm, in a sense, only to obtain my freedom". As the wedding day approached, she began to have doubts and wished to break off the engagement, but Princess Irene of Hesse, who was visiting her sister Grand Duchess Elisabeth Feodorovna, persuaded her otherwise. Soon Maria Pavlovna was again looking forward with enthusiasm to a new life. The wedding took place at Tsarskoye Selo on 3 May [O.S. 20 April] 1908.

== Swedish princess ==
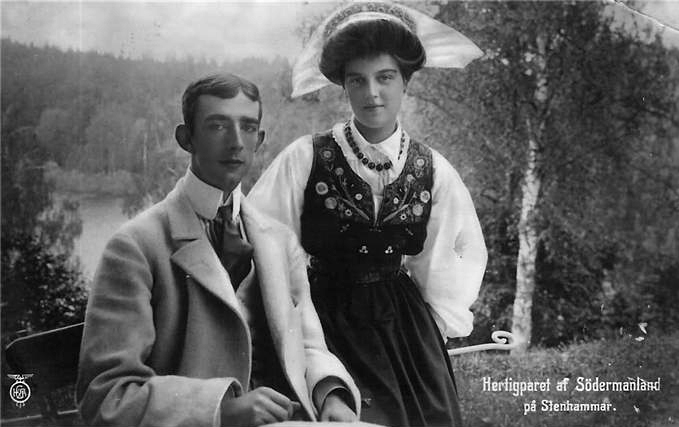
The Duke and Duchess of Södermanland. Maria Pavlovna is wearing a traditional Swedish dress.

After a honeymoon in Germany, Italy and France, the newlyweds went to Sweden, where an official ceremonial reception awaited them with the state flags of Russia and Sweden waving in Stockholm. In the beginning, the marriage looked successful. The couple set up their home in the Swedish countryside in the province of Södermanland. They spent the summer there, returning in October to Stockholm. Maria added Swedish to the other five languages she spoke, and she became popular in her new country. The Swedes felt she worked harder than her husband did. She was well liked by her father-in-law Gustaf V, who appreciated her "effervescence, charm, and unconventionality." Maria Pavlovna, known in Sweden as the Duchess of Södermanland, was pregnant by the fall, but she quickly realized that she had little in common with her husband. Their relationship was cold. She had little interest in him and he in her. The couple's only child was born on 8 May 1909. He was Prince Lennart, Duke of Småland, later Count of Wisborg (1909–2004)

In the autumn of 1910, Maria Pavlovna moved with her husband and their son to Oak Hill, a house she had built for herself outside Stockholm. Maria went hunting, attended horse races, practiced winter sports and even played field hockey on her sister-in-law, Crown Princess Margaret's team. She enrolled at the art school and took painting and singing lessons.

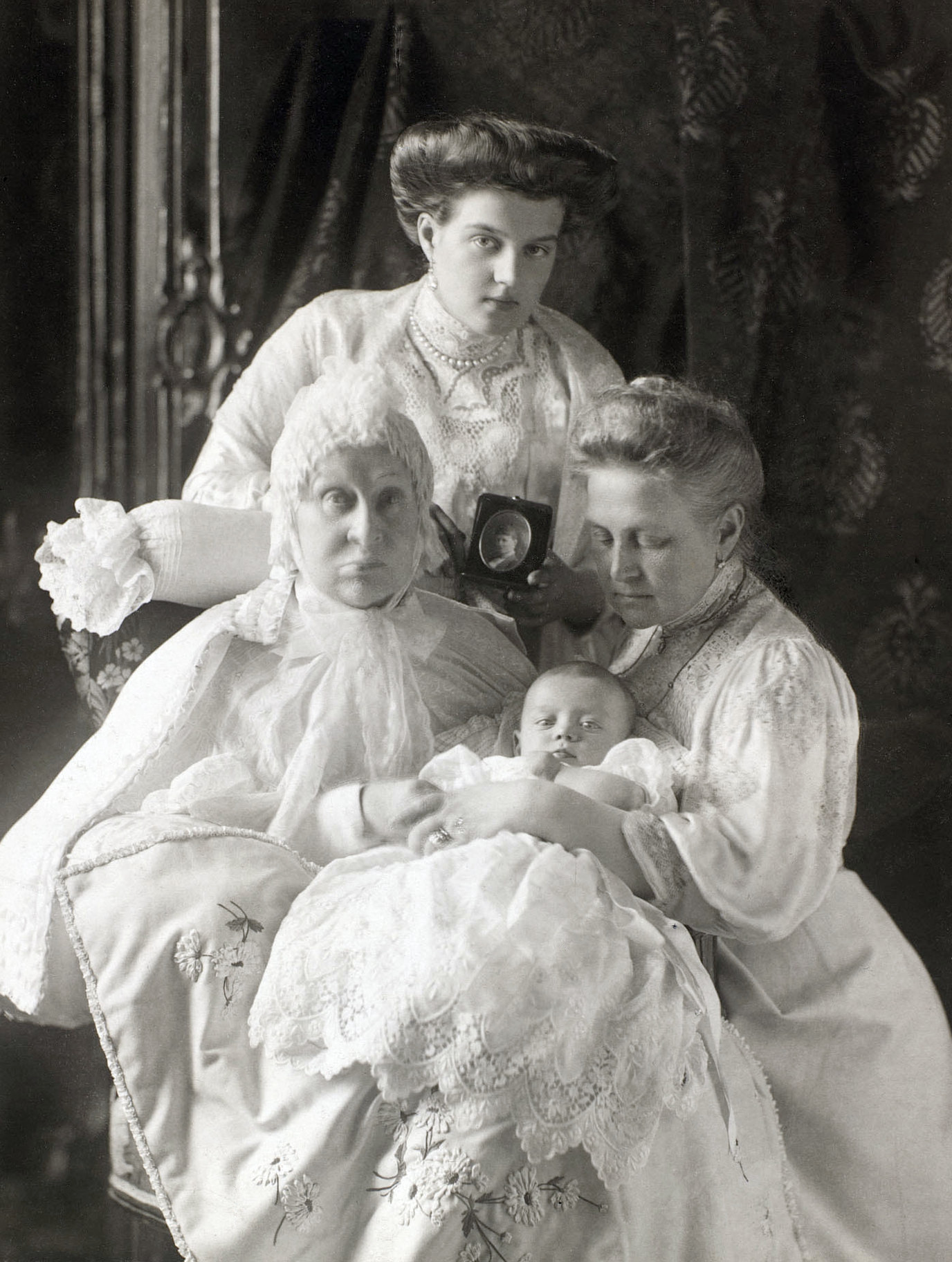
Grand Duchess Maria Pavlovna with her infant son Lennart, her grandmother Queen Olga of Greece and great-grandmother Grand Duchess Alexandra Iosifovna of Russia and a portrait of her dead mother Grand Duchess Alexandra Georgievna in 1909

Maria occasionally played with her son, who remembered sitting on her lap when they slid down a flight of steps on a large silver tray. She also wrote an illustrated alphabet book for Lennart that was published in 1912. However, life at the Swedish court had as many restrictions on Maria Pavlovna as she had had in Russia. Her husband Wilhelm, as a naval officer, had little time to spend with her. She found him "cold, shy, and neglectful", and when she tried to approach him, he walked away from her in tears. At the end of October 1911, the young couple was sent on a five-month trip to Southeast Asia as representatives to the coronation of the King of Siam. Maria had an opportunity to meet other men. King Vajiravudh and the Duke of Montpensier began to court her, and she enjoyed the flirtation. Relations between the couple cooled even more. She told her husband she wanted a divorce. He was devastated by her decision, begging her to give their marriage another chance, "but since he blamed most of our failure on me, we did not make any progress" Maria wrote.

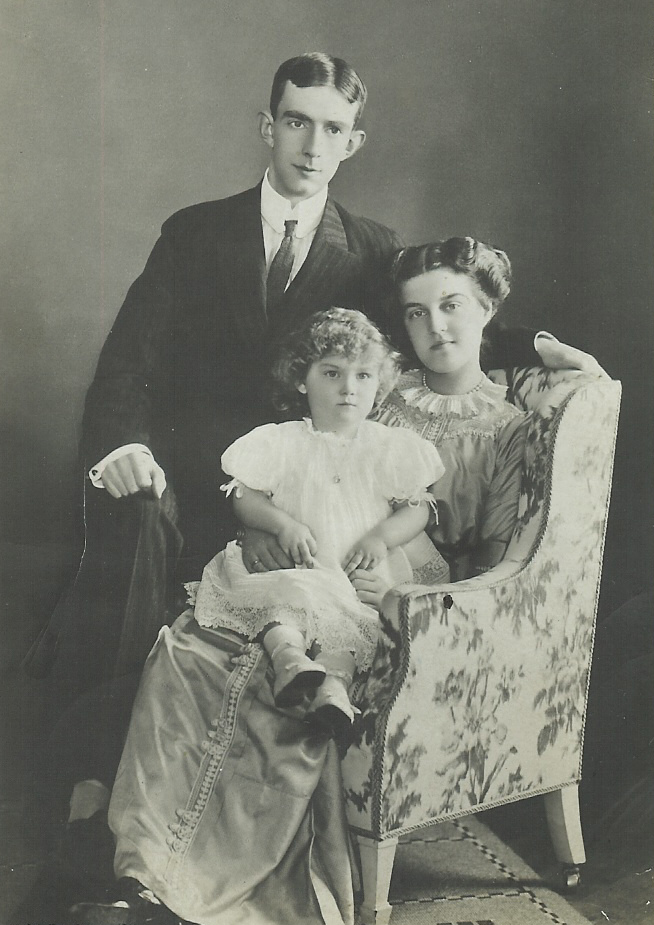
Maria Pavlovna, Prince Wilhelm, and son Lennart in 1911

In the spring of 1912, she received her brother Dimitri, who came to Sweden to take part in the Olympic games. In 1913, they were reunited when she went to Russia to attend the celebrations for the 300-year anniversary of the Romanov family. At a court ball in Moscow, the two danced seven dances in a row and the Tsar sent an equerry to separate them.

When she returned to Stockholm, doctors alleged (falsely as it turned out) that Maria Pavlovna had a serious kidney ailment, and she was sent to Capri to recuperate in the winter 1913–1914. She had been there the previous winter as a companion of her ill mother in-law, the Queen of Sweden. She later claimed that the queen's personal physician Axel Munthe made sexual advances to her, so she decided not to return to Capri. Instead, she stopped in Berlin, where her brother joined her. They continued for Paris. She wanted her father's help to obtain a divorce. Decades later, she described the horror she had felt toward the Swedish royal family because of their unlimited support of Munthe as the main reason she fled them and filed for divorce from Prince Wilhelm. At age 22, she felt the future looked hopeless and noted that in her diary:

"A terrifying thought – year after year with this young geezer and surrounded by that idiotic family! My God!"

Relatives in both Russia and Sweden viewed a divorce as unavoidable, and on 13 March 1914, her marriage officially was dissolved, an action then confirmed by an edict issued by Nicholas II on 15 July 1914. Maria left her son behind in Sweden under his father's custody. He was raised primarily by his paternal grandmother, and he saw his mother rarely in the years thereafter. In an interview as an adult, Lennart said his relationship with his mother was distant.

In Paris, Grand Duchess Maria re-established ties with her father, who had provided her with three half-siblings. Maria Pavlovna studied at a painting school, and then traveled to Italy and Greece. In the spring 1914, age 24, Maria Pavlovna returned to Russia. She lived near her younger brother Dmitri, to whom she was intensely attached. Troubled by her strong need for him, Dmitri distanced himself somewhat from his sister, hurting her terribly. A few months later, World War I began.

== World War I, revolution and second marriage ==
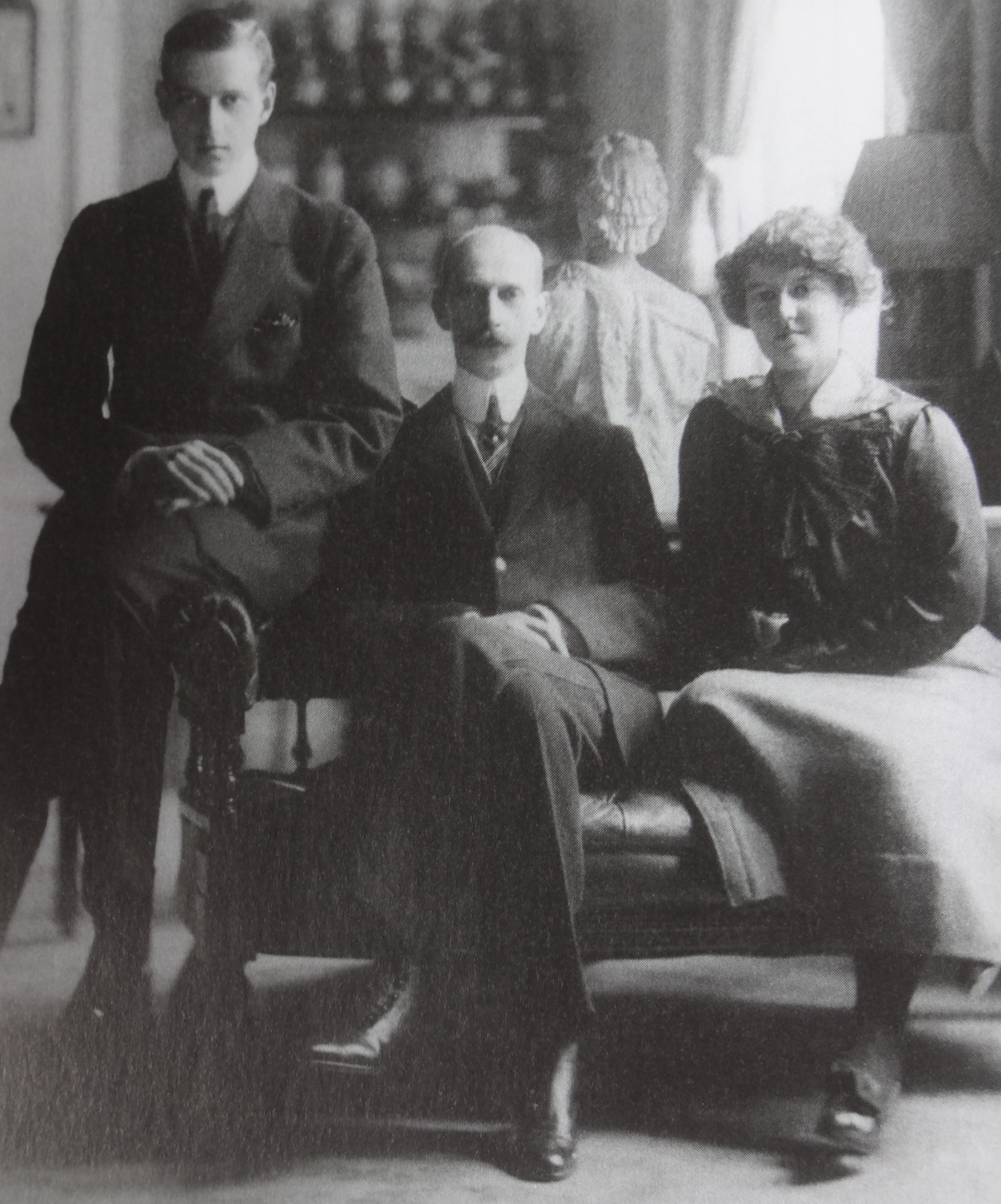
Grand Duke Dmitri Pavlovich and Grand Duchess Maria Pavlovna with their father Grand Duke Paul Alexandrovich, Paris 1914

At the outbreak of the war, Grand Duchess Maria Pavlovna trained as a nurse. With Princess Helen of Serbia, the grand duchess was sent to the northern front, at Instenburg in East Prussia, under command of General Paul von Rennenkampf. For bravery under airplane fire, she was awarded the George Medal. In 1915, after the Russian withdrawal from East Prussia, she took over a hospital at Pskov, where she worked as a nurse. For two and a half years, she treated and bandaged wounded soldiers and officers, even performing simple surgery herself.

During the war, her relationship with her aunt improved, and she visited her regularly at the convent Elizabeth had established. Maria Pavlovna was at Pskov when she learned that Dmitri had participated in the murder of Grigori Rasputin on 17 December 1916; she was stunned. "For the first time in my life," she wrote, "my brother appeared to me an individual standing apart from me, and this feeling of unaccustomed estrangement made me shiver." Maria signed a letter along with other members of the Imperial family, begging Nicholas II to reverse his decision to exile Dmitri to the Persian front.

Two months later, the February Revolution erupted, and Tsar Nicholas II, Maria's first cousin, abdicated. Maria Pavlovna left Pskov for Petrograd joining her father and his family at Tsarkoe Selo. Earlier in the war, she had been reacquainted with Prince Sergei Mikhailovich Putyatin (1893–1966), the son of Prince Mikhail Sergeyevich Putyatin (1861–1938), palace commandant at Tsarskoye Selo, the tsar's country residence. They had met as children, and in the spring 1917, a happy affair began between them. In the summer, they became engaged, and in love for the first time, Maria Pavlovna married Putyatin in the Pavlovsk Palace on 19 September [O.S. 6 September] 1917. The couple spent the early months of their married life in Petrograd, living at first in Dmitri's palace. When the palace was sold, they moved to a small apartment with Sergei's parents.

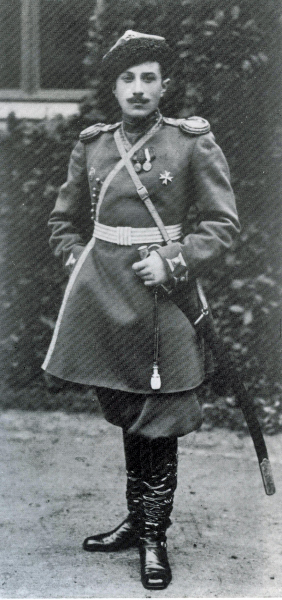
Prince Sergei Mikhailovich Putyatin, Grand Duchess Maria Pavlovna's second husband. He graduated from the Page Corps and joined the Life Guards 4th Infantry Regiment. 1914

The successful Bolshevik coup of November 1917 surprised Maria Pavlovna and her husband in Moscow, where they had traveled to remove some of Maria's jewels from the state bank. They returned to Petrograd with their lives, but without the jewels. Later, Serge's parents retrieved Maria's diamonds. In the spring 1918, the couple moved to a cottage in Tsarkoe Selo to be closer to Grand Duke Paul, who was under house arrest. There, the grand duchess tended a vegetable garden and kept a goat. On 8 July 1918, she gave birth to a son, Prince Roman Sergeievich Putyatin (1918–1919).

The same day of Prince Roman's baptism on 18 July 1918, but they did not know it, Maria's half-brother Prince Vladimir Paley and her aunt Grand Duchess Elizabeth were murdered by the Bolsheviks. With the situation quickly deteriorating in Russia for the Romanovs under the Bolshevik regime, Maria Pavlovna decided to leave for exile, leaving her baby under the care of her in-laws.

With her husband and her brother-in-law Prince Alexander Putyatin (1897–1954), Grand Duchess Maria Pavlovna left Tsarkoie Selo in late July. Without traveling documents and fearing to be arrested at any stop, Maria Pavlovna, her husband and brother-in-law made their way by train during two nights and a day. On 4 August, they reached Orsha, in today's Belarus, joining many other refugees in similar situations. From the train station, they went to the frontier with German-occupied Ukraine. She had concealed, inside a bar of soap, a Swedish document identifying her as a former royal princess of that country. This document allowed her to enter Ukraine. From there, they continued south until reaching Kiev, where new adventures followed. In November, the fugitives made their way to Odessa. After reaching Kishinev, Moldavia, they received an invitation from Queen Marie of Romania, Maria's first cousin, who had used Joseph W. Boyle to track them and bring them to safety. Ill with influenza, the grand duchess arrived in Romania, beginning her life in exile.

== Exile ==
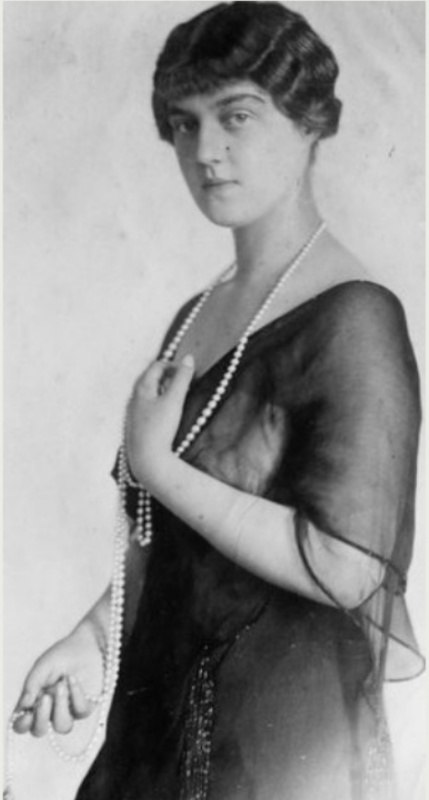
Grand Duchess Maria Pavlovna in exile. 1920s

In December 1918, Grand Duchess Maria Pavlovna and her second husband arrived in Bucharest staying at a local hotel. In January 1919, they were given private apartments at the Cotroceni Palace as guests of Queen Marie of Romania, who was her first cousin. Tragic news came from Russia: the following month, Maria Pavlovna learned that her father Grand Duke Paul Alexandrovich had been assassinated by the Bolsheviks along with three of his cousins. A couple of weeks later, she received the news that her aunt Grand Duchess Elizabeth Feodorovna and half-brother Prince Vladimir Paley had been murdered with several other Romanov relatives in the summer 1918. Tsar Nicholas II and his immediate family had been killed a day earlier.

Maria Pavlovna's parents-in-law arrived in Bucharest with her son Roman, but once she obtained a traveling visa, Maria Pavlovna left with Putyatin for Paris, finding a house in Passy. For the first time in her life, the 28-year-old grand duchess was forced to face everyday problems. "I had never before carried cash with me, nor had I ever written a check. I knew the approximate price of jewels and dresses, but did not have the vaguest idea how much bread, meat and milk cost", she recalled in her book of memoirs. Her first years of exile were financed by the sale of the jewels she had had smuggled to Sweden before escaping Russia. While in Paris in 1919, the grand duchess received a letter from her husband's parents telling her that one-year-old Roman had died of an intestinal disorder on 29 July. Her guilt that she had left him behind prevented her from telling her friends of the baby's existence.

Maria Pavlovna was reunited with her brother Dmitri in London. She rented a small apartment with her husband to be close to her brother, but relations between Dmitri and Putyatin soon soured. Determined to find an occupation that would allow her to make a living, she began knitting sweaters and dresses selling them to a London shop.

In the spring 1920, Maria Pavlovna returned to Paris to meet with her stepmother Princess Olga Paley and Maria's two half-sisters. She decided to stay in the French capital in order to be close to them. Her brother Dmitri followed her to Paris. From 1921, she devoted a great deal of her time to the Russian Red Cross and philanthropic work. Missing her son Lennart, who had been left in Sweden, Maria and Dimitri went to meet him in Copenhagen in the early summer of 1921. Lennart was age 12 and taller than his mother. Two years later, they were reunited for a brief holiday in Germany. They saw each other again in the autumn of 1927 in Brussels when Lennart was age 18. He always harbored a resentment toward his mother, who had abandoned him, and their relationship remained strained.

In Paris, Grand Duchess Maria opened a quality embroidering and sewing textile shop named Kitmir. Through her brother, Maria Pavlovna met Coco Chanel in the autumn 1921. Chanel became her main patron buying Kitmir's embroideries for her fashion house. For a time, Kitmir was a success in the Parisian fashion industry. The grand duchess was helped by her mother-in-law Princess Sophia Putyatina (1866–1940), and she employed Russians refugees in order to help them. However, Kitmir was plagued by organizational problems, resulting in the dissipation of Maria's money from the sale of her jewels and leaving her heavily in debt. While she devoted all her energies to her work, Putyatin preferred to spend his time in the company of Russian officers, fast living and squandering money. Disillusioned with her husband, she divorced him in 1923 "over a fundamental difference in attitude," but she continued to offer Putyatin and his relatives financial assistance.

After her divorce, Maria Pavlovna continued to work in Paris, but she moved to Boulogne, the south west suburb of Paris, where many Russians had taken residence. She began an affair with the famous fashion designer Jean Patou, who was 10 years older than her and who had a large fortune. They lived with great luxury, appearing together in Parisian society events and spending time in Biarritz, Deauville and the French Riviera. Rumors of a possible marriage between them spread in 1925, but Patou, a confirmed bachelor, was reluctant to change his lifestyle. In 1926, Kitmir's business began to decline. In 1928, as embroidery began to be out of fashion, Maria Pavlovva sold her workshop to Maison Hurel. Having suffered a defeat, but not surrendering, the grand duchess moved to London in the spring 1928 where she started selling Prince Igor, her own perfume, following in the footsteps of Chanel No. 5 and Patou's perfume Joy. Failings in advertising and distribution made that Prince Igor was not a success. Undeterred, Grand Duchess Maria Pavlovna emigrated to the United States hoping for a new start. On 8 December 1928, she set sail for America from Le Havre.

== In the United States ==
Grand Duchess Maria Pavlovna's arrival in New York City was greeted by the press with great enthusiasm and curiosity. She was photographed and interviewed a great deal. Accompanied by an American friend, she went as far as California, spending three weeks on a ranch. In January 1929, while recuperating from an ankle injury, she worked on her memoirs which she had been writing for many years. She sent the manuscript to a number of publishers, and on 18 April 1929, it was accepted for publication.

In May 1929, Grand Duchess Maria Pavlovna started working for the New York department store Bergdorf Goodman. She served as a consultant, purchasing fashionable clothing from France. She then returned to Paris, sold her house in Boulogne, bade farewell to her stepmother and half-sisters, and in August 1929, sailed from Marseilles to the United States.

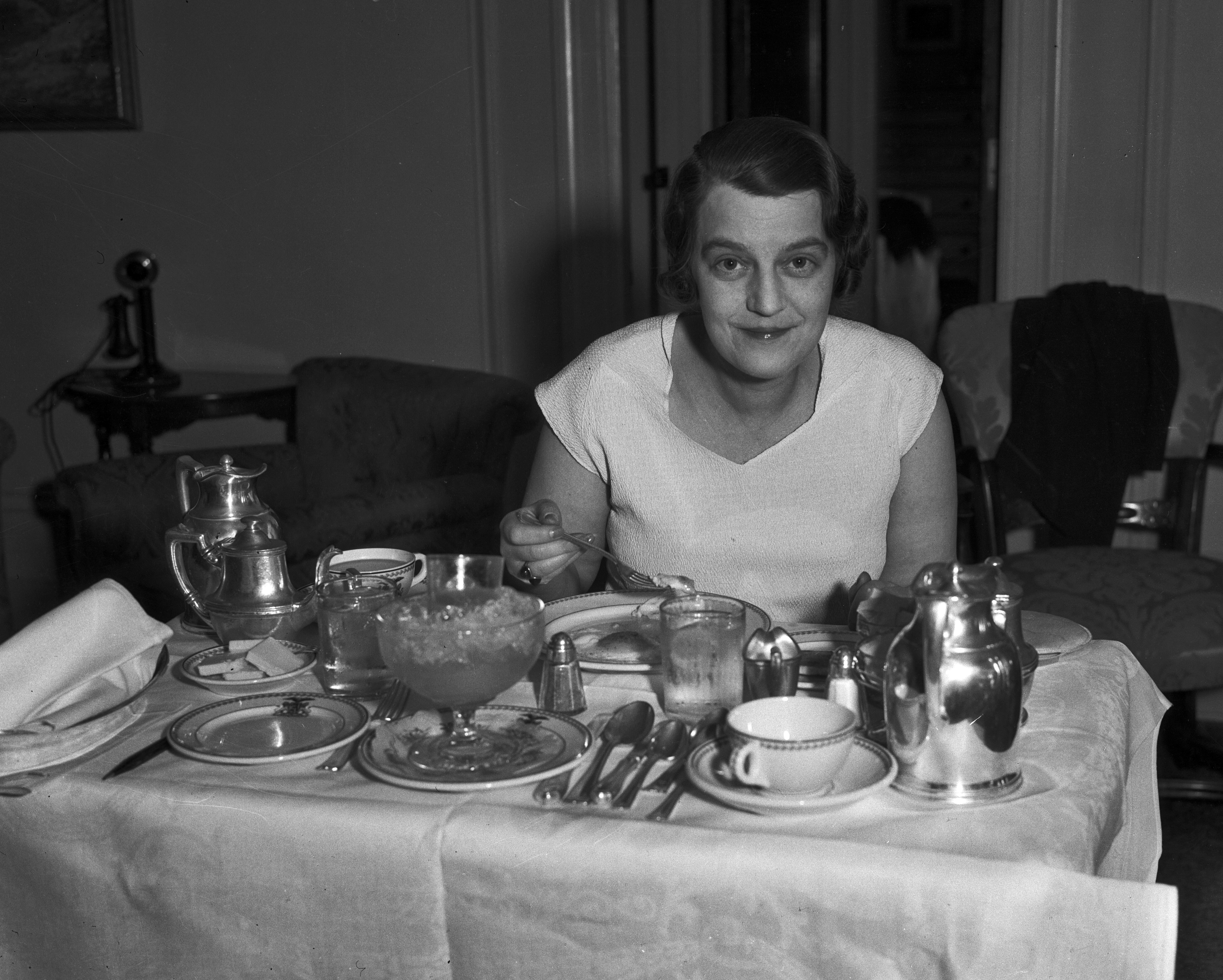
Grand Duchess Maria Pavlona in Los Angeles, 1932

She arrived back in New York with $300, a portable typewriter, and a Russian guitar. She prepared her memoirs for publication, and gave lectures at universities. The Hearst Corporation invited her to write fashion articles and reviews. Her book of memoirs was translated from Russian to English and published in two volumes: the first was titled The Education of a Princess, and the second was A Princess in Exile. They appeared in 1930 and 1932. Both became bestsellers in the United States and in Europe, where they were translated to French and Spanish. The success of her books improved Maria Pavlovna's finances. She also became a popular figure in the lecture circuit. She earned well, but spent freely.

Grand Duchess Maria Pavlovna always had an interest in photography, and in 1935, she was sent by Hearst to Germany as a photojournalist. Part of her job was to take photographs in luxury cruise lines between Europe and New York reporting on the events of first-class, deck society. While living in New York, Maria Pavlovna collected Russian books and surrounded herself with a group of friends that included her half-sister Princess Natalia Paley, the photographer Horst P. Horst, Valentina Sanina, founder of the fashion house Valentina, and Sanina's husband George Schlee.

In 1937, Maria Pavlovna visited her son Lennart and his family in Mainau. They bonded over their shared interest in photography, and she got along with his wife, even though the grand duchess had been disappointed when her son renounced his royal status in order to marry a commoner in 1932. Maria Pavlovna, who had little maternal feelings, took no interest in her two grand daughters: Birgitta, then age 4, and Marie Louise, age two. She asked Lennart to call her by her name as she felt embarrassed to have such a grown-up son. Because of Lennart, the King of Sweden, who sympathized with Maria Pavlovna, arranged a Swedish diplomatic passport for her to replace her old Nansen passport. This document gave her a broader freedom of movement.

In this period, her articles appeared frequently in different publications including Vogue. At Bergdorf Goodman, she created a hat collection. On 15 May 1939, she was interviewed live on the radio during The Lux Radio Theatre broadcast of Tovarich.

In 1941, the United States entered World War II as an ally of the Soviet Union. The friendly alliance of the U.S. toward the Communist country repulsed her. After 12 years living in the United States, she moved to Argentina with the intention of creating a line of cosmetics with friend Countess Elisabeth de Brunière, née Saroukhanoff, a Russian émigré who worked for Elizabeth Arden in Buenos Aires.

== Last years ==
Lesser Coat of Arms of Grand Duchess Maria Pavlovna the younger of Russia; these coat of arms belonged to all legitimate agnatic granddaughters of the Emperor of Russia

In Argentina, Maria Pavlovna rented a small house with a garden in the Barrio Norte in Buenos Aires and devoted her spare time to painting, even managing to sell several of her works. Argentinian newspapers published her articles about interior design, fashion, and art. The cosmetic line did not take off, but Grand Duchess Maria Pavlovna remained in South America. There was a large Russian émigré community in Buenos Aires, and she became close friends with the family of Prince Meshchersky, Prince Michel Aleksandrovich Gorchakov (1905–1996) and his wife Princess Olga, née Orlova-Davydova (1904–1991). During weekends, she went to Los Leones, a huge property owned by Prince Karl von Auersperg (1895–1980) and his wife, Countess Henriette von Meran (1904–2000), member of a morganatic branch of the House of Habsburg. In 1942, she received news of the death of her brother Dmitri in Davos, Switzerland. She grieved over his death. He was the only person she had loved.

In 1947, Maria Pavlovna's son Lennart came from Germany on a business visit that lasted several months. For the first time, they genuinely got to know each other. Maria told Lennart that she had felt lonely all of her life due to her rootless childhood. She spent much of her adulthood looking for love, having affairs, and finding it hard to fill the empty spaces inside of her. Two years later, Maria Pavlovna returned to Europe, where, at the home of her son on the island of Mainau in Germany, she re-encountered her first husband Prince Wilhelm of Sweden for the first time in many years. They departed as good friends.

During the 1950s, Grand Duchess Maria Pavlovna stayed with friends or appeared unexpectedly in Mainau in the house of her son Lennart with her camera, easel and paints. She died from pneumonia, at age 68, on 13 December 1958 in Konstanz, West Germany. She is buried in a side altar of the palace church in Mainau, next to her brother Grand Duke Dmitri.

== Ancestry ==
Ancestors of Grand Duchess Maria Pavlovna of Russia (1890–1958)

8. Nicholas I of Russia
4. Alexander II of Russia
9. Princess Charlotte of Prussia
2. Grand Duke Paul Alexandrovich of Russia
10. Louis II, Grand Duke of Hesse and by Rhine
5. Princess Marie of Hesse and by Rhine
11. Princess Wilhelmine of Baden
1. Grand Duchess Maria Pavlovna of Russia
12. Christian IX of Denmark
6. George I of Greece
13. Princess Louise of Hesse-Kassel
3. Princess Alexandra of Greece and Denmark
14. Grand Duke Constantine Nikolaevich of Russia
7. Grand Duchess Olga Constantinovna of Russia
15. Princess Alexandra of Saxe-Altenburg

== Works ==
- Education of a Princess (1930)
