= Emanuel von Sievers =

Baltic German aristocrat

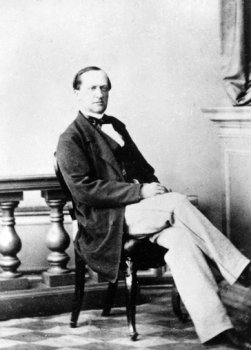
- Portrait of Count von Sievers
- Born: 9 May [O.S. 27 April] 1817; Vodolagi, Valkovsky Uyezd, Sloboda Ukraine Governorate, Russian Empire
- Died: 25 May [O.S. 12 May] 1909 (aged 92); Wenden, Livonia Governorate, Russian Empire

Count Emanuel von Sievers (Russian: Эммануи́л Ка́рлович Си́верс, romanized: Emmanuil Karlovich Sivers; 1817–1909) was a Baltic German aristocrat who was a senator of the Russian Empire and grand master of the imperial court.

== Biography ==
Emanuel von Sievers was one of the sons of General Carl Gustav von Sievers (1772–1853). He graduated first in Cēsis, Birkenruh Gymnasium, later studied in St. Petersburg and entered the senior civil service. He was director of the Department of Foreign Cultures in Moscow in 1858 and was appointed chamberlain of the imperial court in 1864, under the reign of Alexander II of Russia, then grand master of the court in 1877. He became senator in 1873.

== Labours in Cēsis and at Wenden Castle ==
Count Emanuel von Sievers successfully completed his father's rebuilding of the New Castle, including the building of the library in the newly built Lademaher tower.

In Cēsis, Count Emanuel von Sievers was known as a city councilor, an art connoisseur and supporter whose merit also includes some of his own sketches of Cēsis Castle Manor, which have been preserved in the form of lithographs to the present day.

In 1858 he donated to the Cēsis Jānis Church an altar painting by the Estonian painter Johann Köler, who later became known throughout Europe. He also funded the studies of Köler, who is considered the founder of Estonian national painting at the St. Petersburg Academy of Arts. In 1884 St. John's stained glass was created with Vidzeme armor coats of arms. Count Emanuel von Sievers also donated funds for stained glass, and even today in the church window one can see the Coat of Arms of the Count von Sievers.

Count Emanuel von Sievers died on 12 May 1909 in Cēsis, and was buried in the family tomb at the Orthodox Church of the Transfiguration of Christ in Cēsis.

== Family ==
In 1847 Count von Sievers married the Countess Elise von Koskull (1824–1901).

== See also ==
- Sievers family
- Johann Köler
