= Siever =

Siever is a surname. Notable people with the surname include:

- Ed Siever (1877–1920), American baseball pitcher
- Larry J. Siever (1947–2021), American psychiatrist
- Paul Siever (born 1969), American football offensive lineman

== See also ==
- Sievers
- Seaver
