= Ivaski =

Village in Estonia

- village
- Location in Estonia
- Coordinates: 58°25′09″N 25°21′41″E
- Country: Estonia
- County: Viljandi County
- Municipality: Põhja-Sakala Parish

Population (2009)
  - Total: 74

Ivaski is a village in Põhja-Sakala Parish, Viljandi County, Estonia. It has a population of 74 (as of 2009).

The first Estonian professional painter Johann Köler (1826–1899) was born in Lubjassaare farm in Ivaski.
