= Putyatin (family) =

Russian noble family

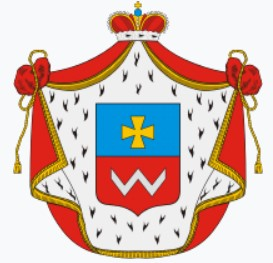
Coat of Arms of Princes Putyatin

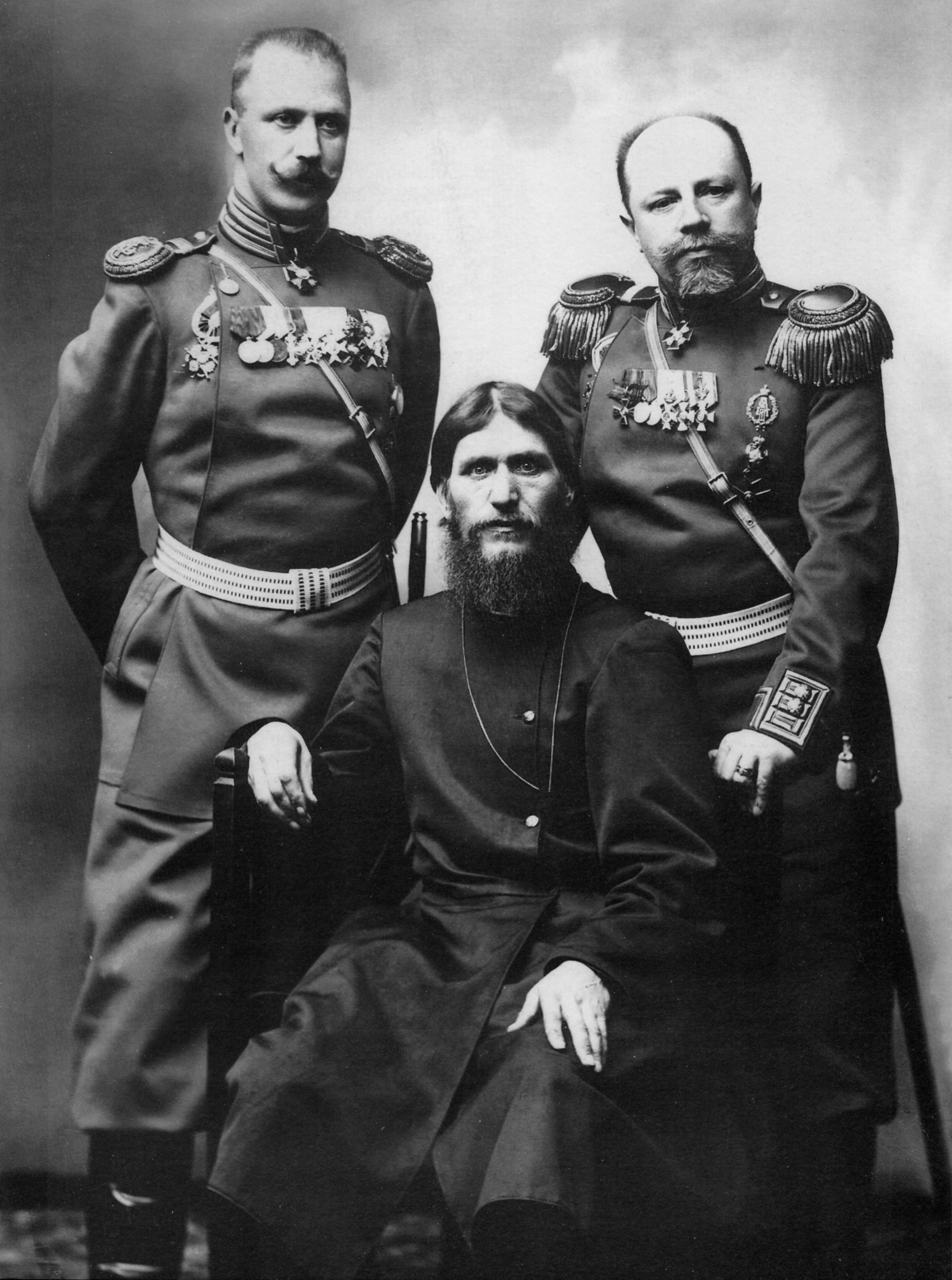
Rasputin with prince M. Putyatin, since 1911 Head of the Palace Board and colonel D. Loman on the right side, photo by Karl Bulla, 1907 or 1908

The House of Putyatin (Russian: Путятин, also romanized Poutiatine, Putjatin, Putiatin), is a Russian noble family with princely and noble lines of Rurikid origin. They branched from the dukes of the autonomous principality of Drutsk (themselves a branch of the Izyaslavichi of Polotsk), sometime in mid-15th century.

== History ==
The Putyatin family traces its origins to the 9th century in Russia, securing a distinguished position within the annals of Russian nobility. The family's historical ties to the Russian elite are extensively documented, and their association with the imperial family attained particular prominence during the Russian Revolution of 1917. The family lineage can be more precisely traced to the 14th century, marking the establishment of the Russian Princely House of Putyatin.

The Putyatin Princes are descendants of the Rurikid Prince Ivan ‘Poutiaia’ Drutzkoy, who is referenced in historical records from the year 1423 and is acknowledged as the progenitor of both the Drutzkoy-Sokolinsky and Putyatin families. Prince Ivan, a notable Boyar of the 14th century, served under Grand Prince Dmitry Donskoy of Moscow. The early history of the Putyatin family is intricately linked with the Vladimir-Suzdal Principality and subsequently the Grand Duchy of Moscow. As boyars, military leaders, and administrators, the Putyatins played pivotal roles in the political and social spheres of Russian life. The family was a fundamental component of the Vladimir-Suzdal nobility, which governed the principality from the 12th to the 14th centuries.

The influence of the Putyatin family in the Tver region is well-documented, with their presence dating back to the 14th century. Their significant land holdings in the Tver Province included estates and villages in Tver, Staritsa, and Zubtsov. By the 14th century, the family had relocated to Moscow, integrating into the Moscow Boyar Class and serving as advisors and administrators to the Grand Princes of Moscow. Throughout the 15th and 16th centuries, members of the House of Putyatin continued to play influential roles in the Muscovite government, military, and church.

In the 17th and 18th centuries, the Putyatins maintained close affiliations with the Romanov dynasty. Several family members achieved notable prominence in Russian politics, diplomacy, culture, and society, further solidifying their esteemed status within the nation's aristocracy demonstrating the historic nature of this ancient Russian princely family.

== Notable figures of the princely family ==
- Prince Nikolai Putyatin, Russian philanthropist and philosopher.
- Duke Mikiitta Iivananpoika Putyatin settled after mid-15th century to the service of Moscow and received estates from Ivan III
- Duke Taavetti Mikiitanpoika Putyatin held in the beginning of the 16th century a remarkable bunch of landed estates in Karelia of Käkisalmi in eastern Finland. He is ancestor of all the presently living members of the princely family of Putyatin. The taxation register of Vatja from the year 1500 lists several of his holdings.
- Prince Sergei Putyatin, the second husband of Grand Duchess Maria Pavlovna the younger (1890–1958)

== Members of other (non-princely) Putiatin families ==
- Yevfimy Putyatin, Russian admiral. He was not a member of the princely family which were Rurikids, instead the admiral came from another family with the same surname,
