= Murder of Teresa Sievers =

2015 murder in Florida

Teresa Sievers
- Born: Teresa Ann Grace Tottenham; November 19, 1968; Derby, Connecticut, U.S.
- Died: June 28, 2015 (aged 46); Bonita Springs, Florida, U.S.
- Cause of death: Homicide by bludgeoning
- Occupation: Doctor
- Children: 2

On June 28, 2015, 46-year-old Teresa Sievers was murdered at her home in Bonita Springs, Florida. Two men bludgeoned her to death with a hammer, striking her seventeen times. Police arrested Curtis Wayne Wright Jr. and Jimmy Ray Rodgers, both from Missouri, for the crime. In December 2015, Teresa's husband, Mark Sievers, was arrested and accused of masterminding the murder. The motive was life insurance money and the fear that Teresa would take their children away. All three men were found guilty. Wright received a twenty-five-year sentence, Rodgers was sentenced to life in prison, and Mark Sievers was sentenced to death.

== Background ==
Teresa Sievers (born Teresa Ann Grace Tottenham) was born on November 19, 1968, at Griffin Hospital in Derby, Connecticut. Her parents separated when she was one month old and she was raised by her mother. Since sixth grade, she had an interest in medicine and wanted to become a doctor. She was the valedictorian of her high school class. In 1996, she graduated from the Ross University School of Medicine in Dominica. She later completed a pre-med course at Fairfield University and completed her residency at the University of Florida.

Following the dissolution of her first marriage, Teresa married Mark Sievers, the brother of one of her friends, in 2003. The couple had two children who were aged 11 and 8 at the time of their mother's murder. In 2006, the Sievers family moved to Bonita Springs, Florida, and the couple set up a holistic medical practice called Restorative Health and Healing Center in Estero. Shortly before her death, Teresa was profiled in a local women's magazine.

== Murder ==
In 2015, Mark went to the wedding of his childhood friend Curtis Wayne Wright Jr. in Missouri. Mark confided in Wright that he was having marriage problems with Teresa. Mark feared she was going to take their children away from him and said he could not afford to fight for custody. Wright told Mark that his only option was for Teresa to die. Mark said he would pay Wright to help him, so the two men then planned how to kill Teresa. Mark also wanted Teresa killed so he could claim life insurance money. Investigators would later discover there were five insurance policies on Teresa totaling $4.433 million. Unbeknownst to Mark, Wright later enlisted the help of a third man to assist in the killing, Jimmy Ray Rodgers, who Wright paid to help him.

On the morning of June 27, 2015, Wright took a rental car from Hillsboro, Missouri and went to pick up Rodgers. The two men then drove over 1,000 miles to the Sievers family home in Bonita Springs, Florida. A GPS system log, which was later shown as evidence in court, tracked the route the men took. En route, they stopped at a gas station and were caught on surveillance tape. Wright and Rodgers arrived at the Sievers' home at approximately 6:00 a.m. on the morning of June 28. They entered the property and disabled the security alarm before leaving and taking another drive. The men were caught on surveillance tape at a local Walmart store where they purchased trash bags, wet wipes, black towels, black shoes, and a lock-picking kit. They then returned to the Sievers' home and waited for several hours until Teresa returned.

Teresa landed at Southwest Florida International Airport that night, having cut short a family vacation in Connecticut. Mark had driven her to LaGuardia Airport in New York City earlier in the day so she could catch a flight home. She had flown home alone so she could see patients at her clinic the following morning. She was last seen alive on surveillance video at the airport in Florida. Upon arriving home, she was ambushed by Wright and Rodgers, who killed her by bludgeoning her seventeen times with a hammer. Her killers then left and drove back to Missouri in the early hours of June 29.

== Aftermath ==
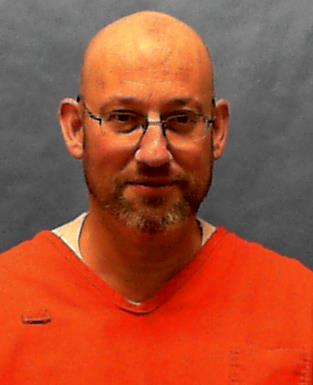
Mark Sievers

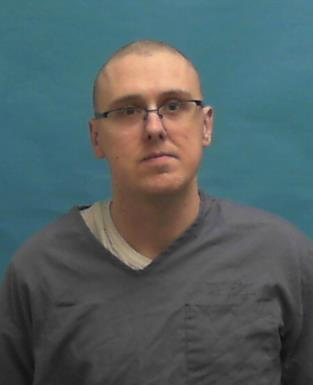
Jimmy Ray Rodgers

On the morning of June 29, Teresa was found dead at her home by a family friend. Mark had called the friend to check up on her after she failed to show up at work. She was discovered lying on the kitchen floor and investigators found a hammer next to her body. A week later, her funeral took place at Unity Church in Naples. Mark attended the funeral appearing distraught. At the funeral, he gave a speech and said, "I was, and still am, the luckiest man in the world."

No leads came in the case for nearly two months. In August 2015, police acted on a tip and arrested Rodgers and Wright in Missouri. Both men were charged with murder. Rodgers' girlfriend helped police with their investigation and told them that Rodgers had admitted to killing Teresa. She claimed that Rodgers had told her that Mark had hired Wright, who then hired Rodgers, to murder his wife for life insurance money.

By this time, Mark Sievers had already been under suspicion. In December 2015, he was charged with murder after a connection was found between him and Wright. Hours after Teresa's funeral, investigators had watched him throw computer equipment into a dumpster behind the couple's medical office. While Mark had initially been cooperative and handed over his cell phone to investigators, he later refused to cooperate.

On May 11, 2016, Teresa's mother gained custody of the Sievers couple's children as the case prepared to move toward trial.

== Trials ==
Wright took a 25-year plea deal in exchange for his testimony against Mark and Rodgers. In 2016, Wright pleaded guilty to second-degree murder and was sentenced to twenty-five years in prison. Rodgers initially faced a first-degree murder charge and the possibility of the death penalty. However, he was found guilty of the lesser charge of second-degree murder, in addition to trespassing. On October 23, 2019, a Lee County jury found him guilty, and on December 12, 2019, he was sentenced to life in prison.

On December 4, 2019, Mark Sievers was convicted of first-degree murder, and the jury unanimously recommended he receive the death penalty. On January 3, 2020, Judge Bruce Kyle sentenced him to death. He remains on death row at Union Correctional Institution. On November 17, 2022, his conviction was affirmed by the Florida Supreme Court and his death row appeal was denied. Two weeks later, Sievers filed a new motion for a rehearing in hopes of reversing the ruling.

== In popular culture ==
In February 2017, the CBS News documentary show, 48 Hours, aired an episode that focused on the murder. Three years later in February 2020, they aired another episode that focused on the murder trials that followed her killing.

On September 14, 2017, Crime Watch Daily released a video segment focusing on the murder. They continued to track the story until May 2019, with the original video segment being released on their YouTube channel on May 6, 2019.

On December 10, 2019, WFTX-TV (FOX 4 Now) released footage from Mark Sievers' trial when the jury recommended he be sentenced to death. The video went viral on their YouTube channel and has since received over fourteen million views.

On December 3, 2020, A&E TV's Killer Cases aired an episode about Teresa called "The Doctor Is Dead".

== See also ==
- List of death row inmates in the United States § Florida
