= Jay Webber Seaver =

American physician

Jay Webber Seaver (March 9, 1855 – May 5, 1915 ) was an American physician and a pioneer of anthropometry.

== Life ==
Seaver was born in Craftsbury, Vermont as son of William Seaver and Betsy Urie, and had four siblings. He studied at the Yale School of Medicine, where he became professor in his later life. Seaver measured the bodies of thousands of people attending the summer school resort at Chautauqua, New York., and published the results of his studies in his work Anthropometry and physical examination. A book for practical use in connection with gymnastic work and physical education.. On July 1, 1886, he married Leona Nancy Sheldon Sullivan.

Seaver died in Berkeley, California, and was buried at Chautauqua Cemetery on the main road to Jamestown.

== Honors and awards ==
Honorary Fellow in Memoriam, National Academy of Kinesiology.
