= E. E. Seevers =

American politician

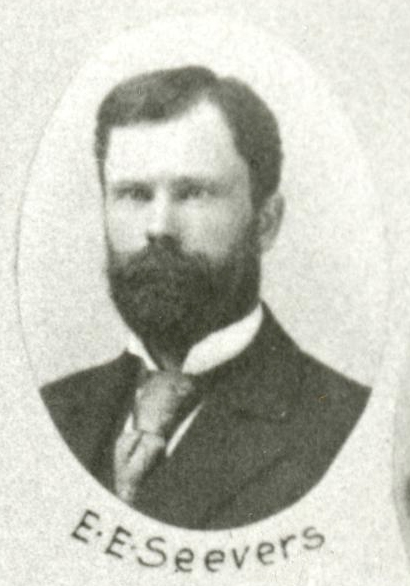
- Seevers in 1895

Member of the Washington House of Representatives for the 32nd district
- In office 1895–1897

Personal details
- Born: April 10, 1862 Oskaloosa, Iowa, United States
- Died: May 28, 1927 (aged 65) Sedro Woolley, Washington, United States
- Party: People's Party

Edward E. Seevers (April 10, 1862 – May 28, 1927) was an American politician in the state of Washington. He served in the Washington House of Representatives from 1895 to 1897.
