= Sievers family =

Baltic German noble family

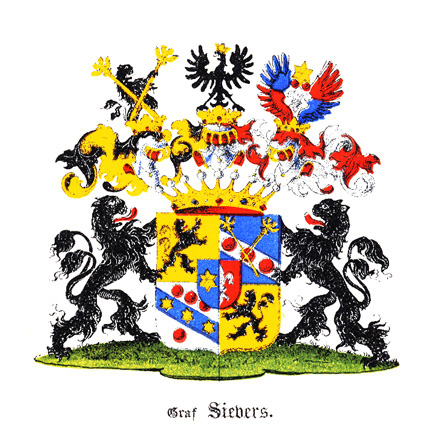
The Holy Roman Sievers family's coat of arms

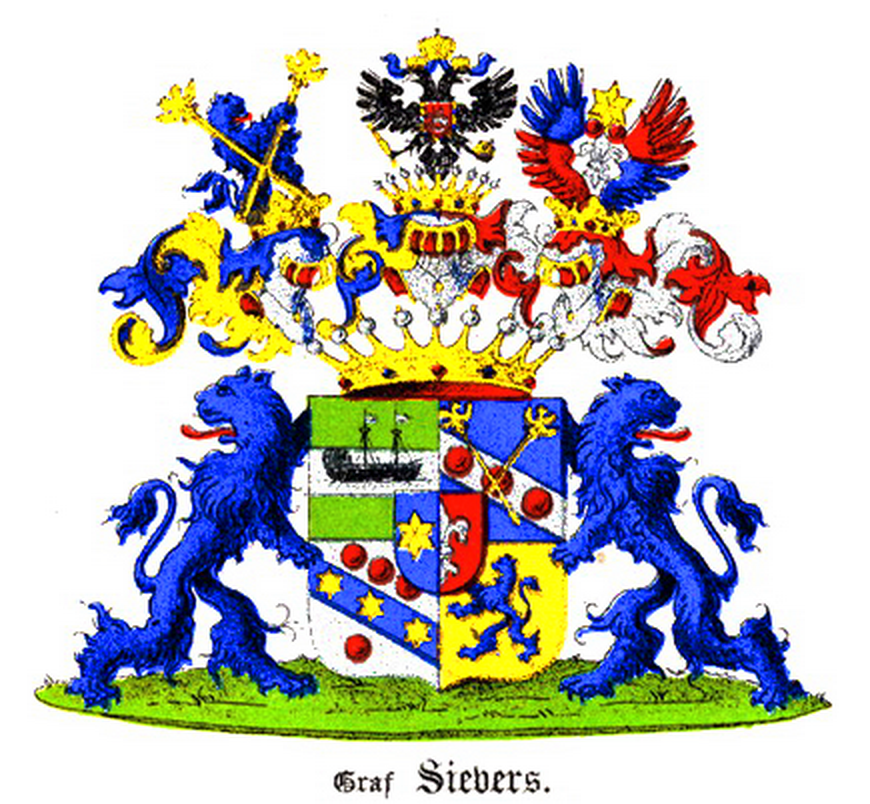
The Russian Sievers family's coat of arms

The Sievers family is a prominent Baltic-German noble family that also belonged to the Russian nobility.

== History ==
They owned a number of estates in the present-day Baltic States, including the Wenden Castle. It originated from the Duchy of Holstein. The family was awarded with the title of Imperial Count in 1760 by Francis I, Holy Roman Emperor.

== Notable members ==
- Karl von Sievers (1710–74) owed his rise to a brief liaison with Tsarina Elisabeth. He was made a Count of the Holy Roman Empire in 1760.
- His daughter Elisabeth (1746-1818) captivated Giacomo Casanova but married her cousin Jacob Sievers who administered the north-west of modern-day Russia and built the Sievers Canal connecting the Msta and Volkhov rivers. Her second husband was Prince Nikolai Putyatin. She also had a natural daughter who married historian Nikolai Karamzin.
- Jacob's nephews Karl, Johann and Jacob were all generals prominent in the Russian service during the Napoleonic Wars.
- Count Emanuel von Sievers (1817-1909) a senator of the Russian Empire and grand master of the imperial court.
