= Johann Köler =

Estonian artist (1826–1899)

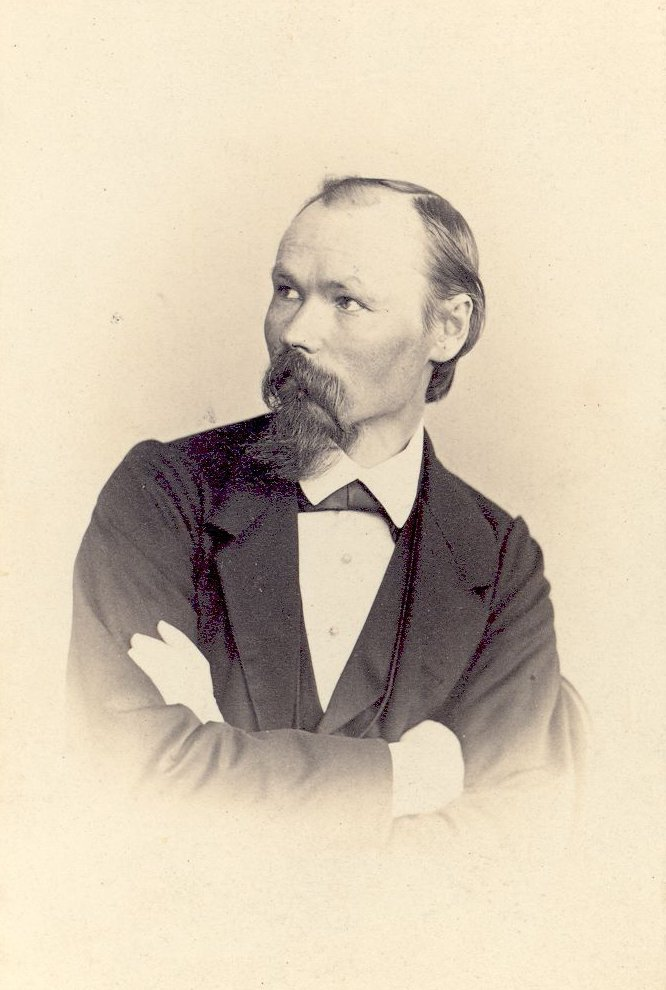
- Born: 8 March 1826; Wask, Governorate of Livonia, Russian Empire
- Died: 22 April 1899 (aged 73); Saint Petersburg, Russian Empire
- Education: Alexey Markov
- Alma mater: Imperial Academy of Arts (1857)
- Known for: Painting
- Awards: Big Gold Medal of the Imperial Academy of Arts (1857)
- Elected: Member Academy of Arts (1860); Professor by rank (1867)

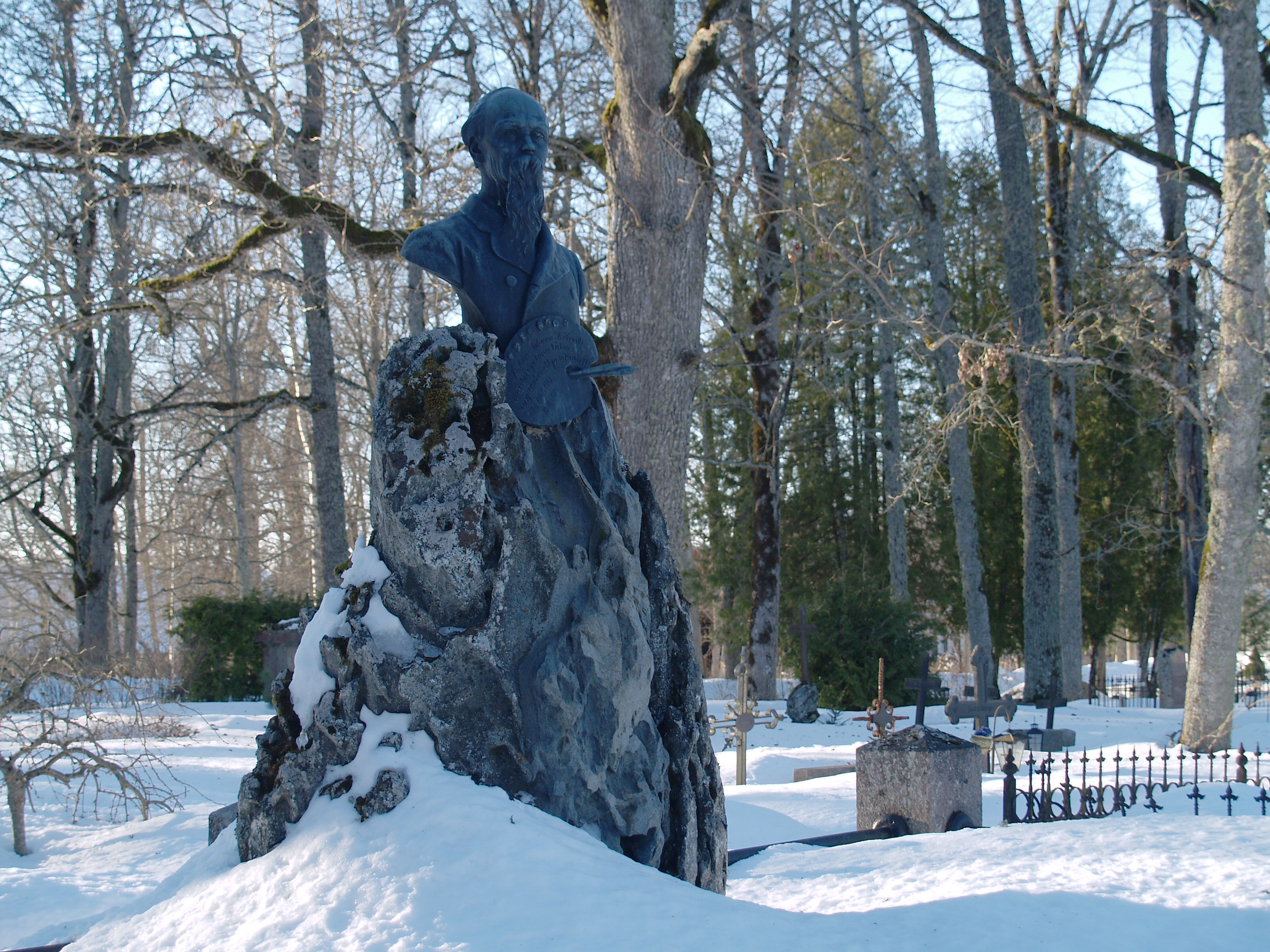
Grave of Johann Köler in the Suure-Jaani cemetery. Bust by sculptor Amandus Adamson

Johann Köler (8 March 1826 – 22 April 1899) was a leader of the Estonian national awakening and a painter. He is considered as the first professional painter of the emerging nation. He distinguished himself primarily by his portraiture and to a lesser extent by his landscape paintings. Some of his most notable pictures depict the Estonian rural life in the second half of the 19th century.

== Life and work ==
Johann Köler was born as the seventh child to a peasant family in Lubjassaare farmstead in Wast (present-day Ivaski), Viljandi County. Despite the poverty of the parents Köler managed to attend the elementary and the district schools in Fellin (present-day Viljandi), Livonia. Then he attended a workshop of master painters in Cēsis. In 1846, Köler travelled to St. Petersburg to work as a sign writer, where his talent was soon discovered. From 1848 to 1855 Johan Köler studied drawing and painting at the St. Petersburg Imperial Academy of Arts.

During 1857 Köler travelled to Paris via Berlin, later returned to Germany, then travelled to the Netherlands and Belgium. In 1858, he travelled across the Alps to Milan, Geneva, Florence and Rome. There, he studied in a private academy and devoted his time to watercolor technique. In Rome during 1859 he presented his composition "Christ on the Cross".

Answering the call of the St. Petersburg Academy of Arts, Köler returned to the city in 1861. From 1862 to 1874 he was a teacher of the Grand Duchess Maria Aleksandrovna, the daughter of Czar Alexander II. In 1869–1870, he worked as a lecturer at the academy. From 1886 to 1889 Köler worked in Vienna, Nice, and Paris.

== Estonian national awakening ==
The peak of Johann Köler's career coincided with the rise of the Estonian national awakening and he used his position in the imperial court to promote the cause of the Estonian people. He also was a friend of the journalist Carl Robert Jakobson, one of the authors of the idea of the Estonian self-determination.

From 1891 to 1893 Köler was the president of the Society of Estonian Literati (Eesti Kirjameeste Selts).

== Miscellaneous ==
The town of Viljandi inaugurated a monument to Köler in 1976. Eesti Post issued a commemorative postage stamp celebrating the 175th anniversary of his birth in 2001.

== Best-known works ==
=== Italian Woman with Children by a Stream ===
Italian Woman with Children by a Stream is an 1862 painting by Köler. The work has dimensions 82.5 cm x 53.5 cm. The work belongs to the Art Museum of Estonia's collection and is exhibited in Kumu Art Museum.

The painting is a realistic view with a warm color palette.

=== Lorelei Cursed by Monks ===
Lorelei Cursed by Monks (Estonian: Lorelei needmine munkade poolt) is an oil painting on canvas painted in 1887, depicting the mythological nymph of the Rhine. It is part of the collection of the Art Museum of Estonia and is exhibited in the Kumu Art Museum in Tallinn. The dimensions of the painting are 345 cm wide by 395 cm high. (136 in X 156 in)

== Gallery ==
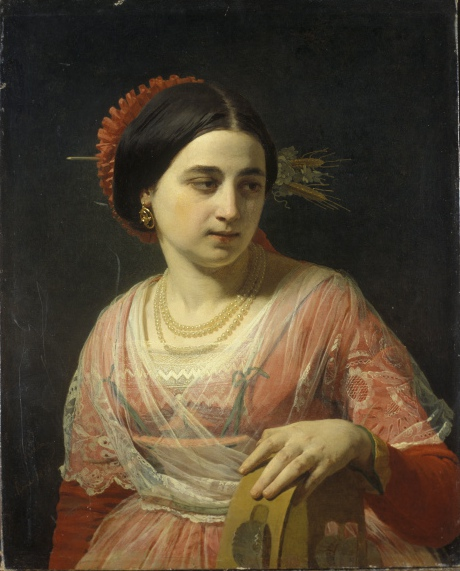
Roman Woman, 1858

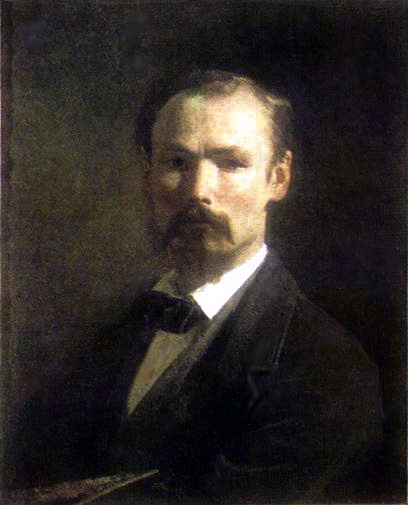
Self-Portrait, 1859

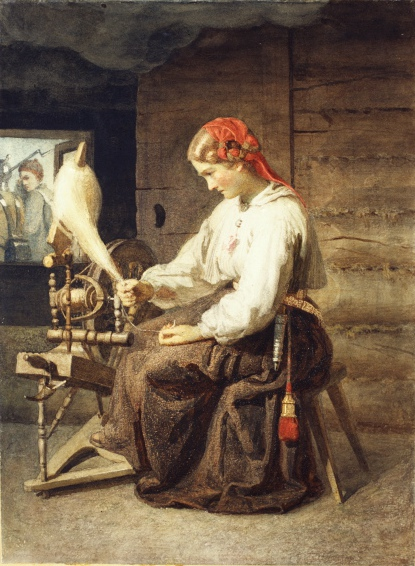
Spinning Woman, 1863

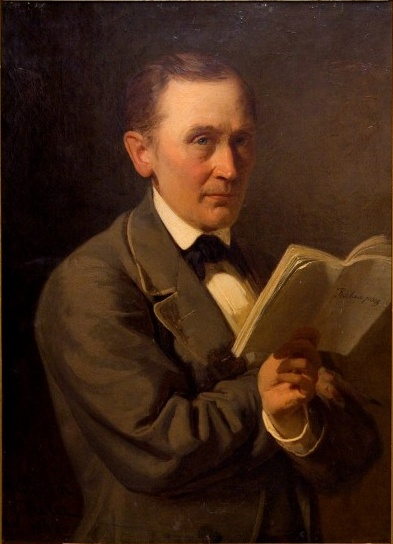
Friedrich Reinhold Kreutzwald, 1864

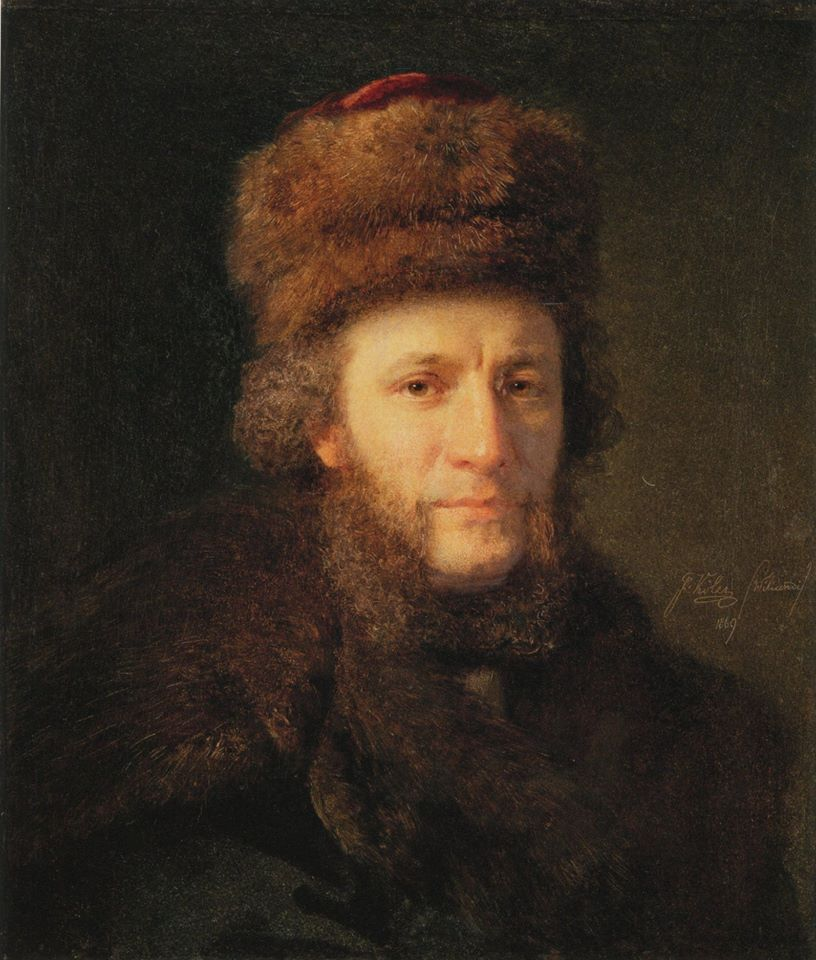
Pyotr Semyonov-Tyan-Shansky, 1866

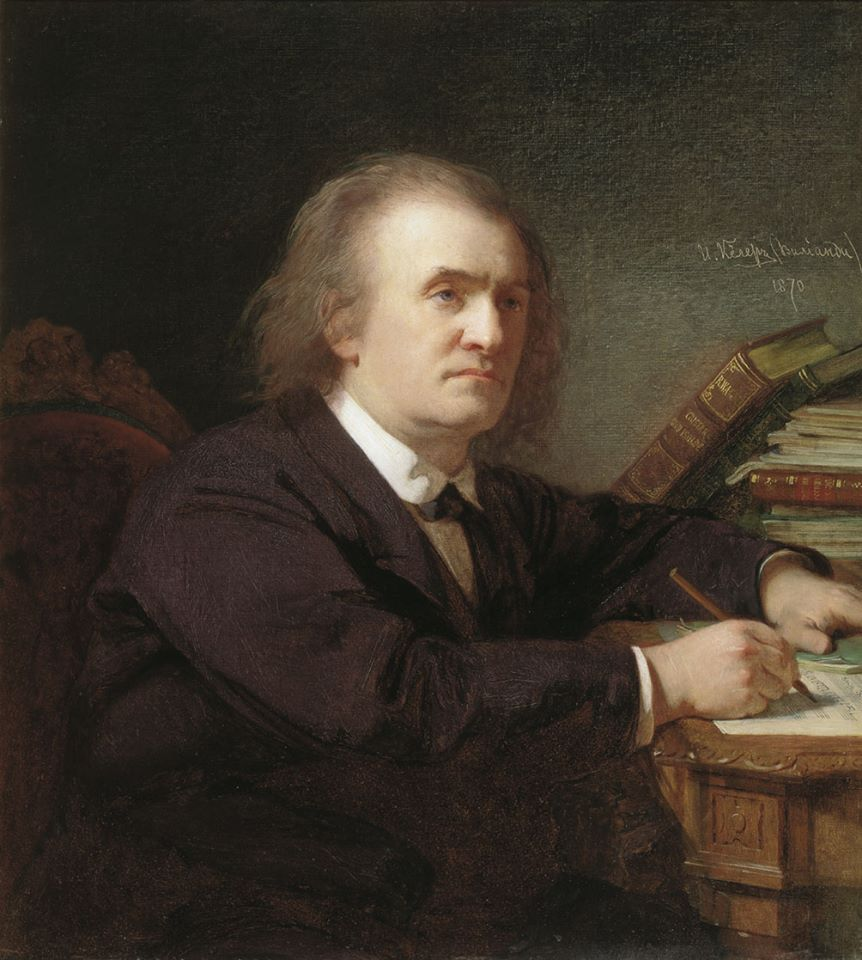
Alexander Serov, 1870

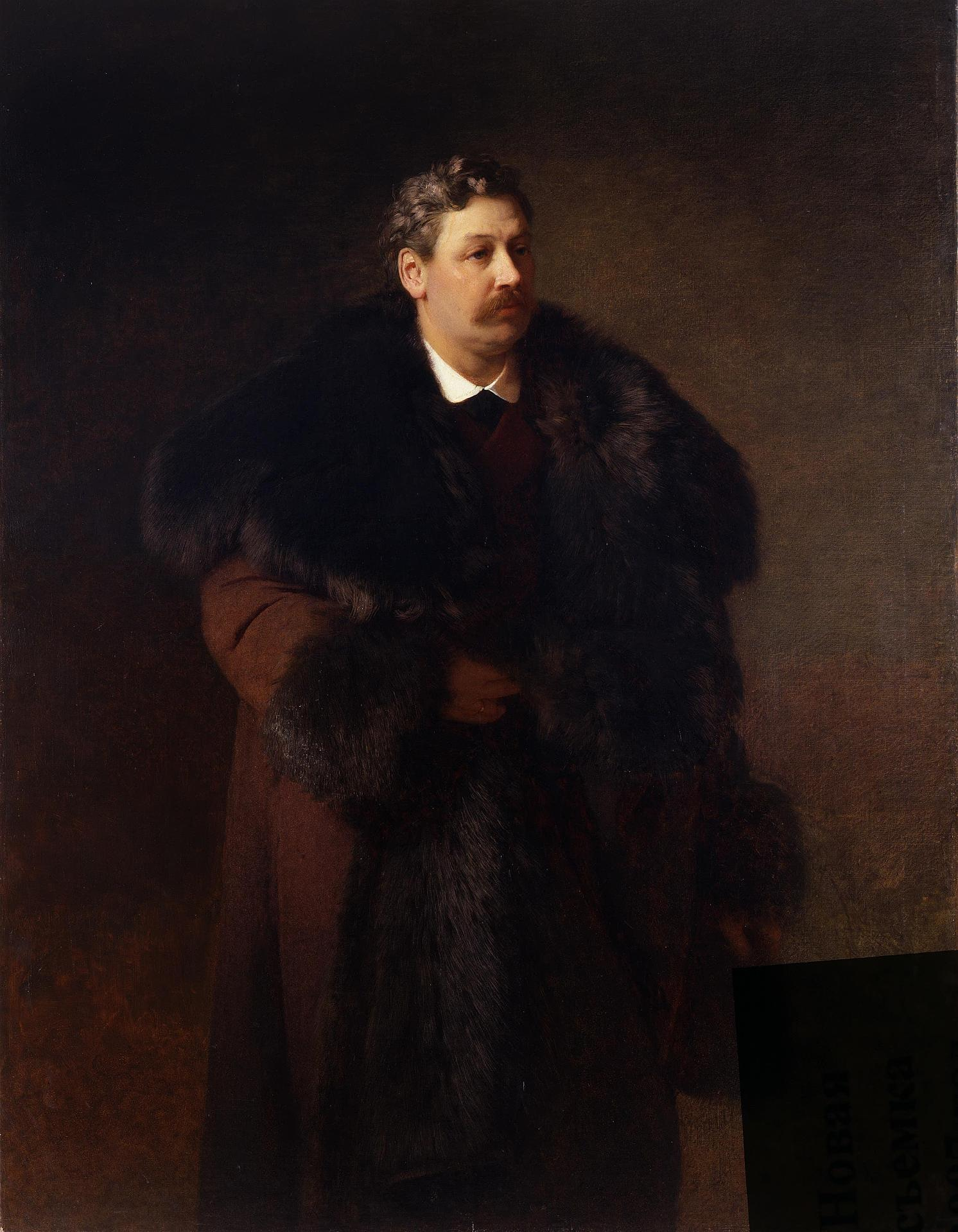
Count Platon Aleksandrovich Zubov, 1873

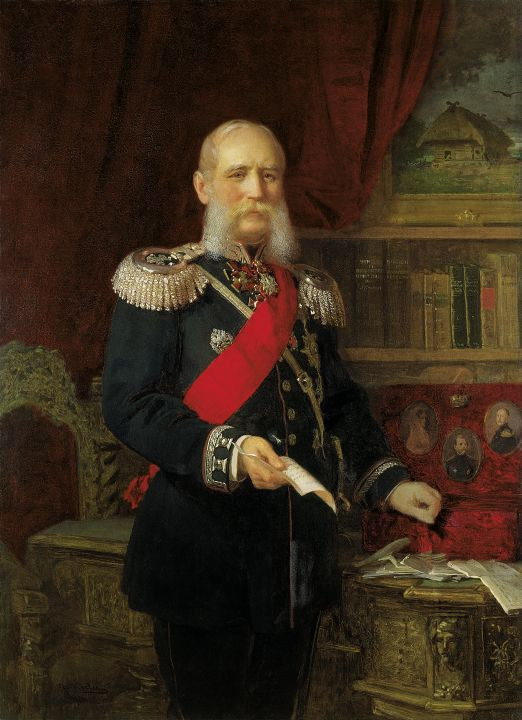
Philipp Karell, 1886

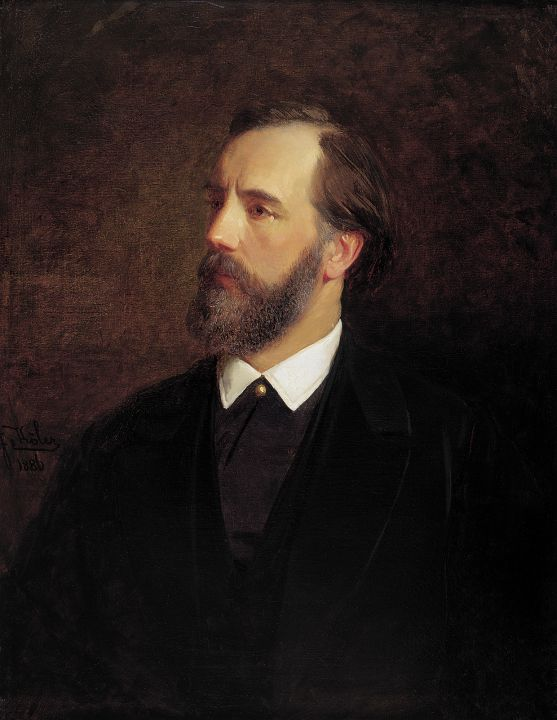
Hugo Treffner, 1886
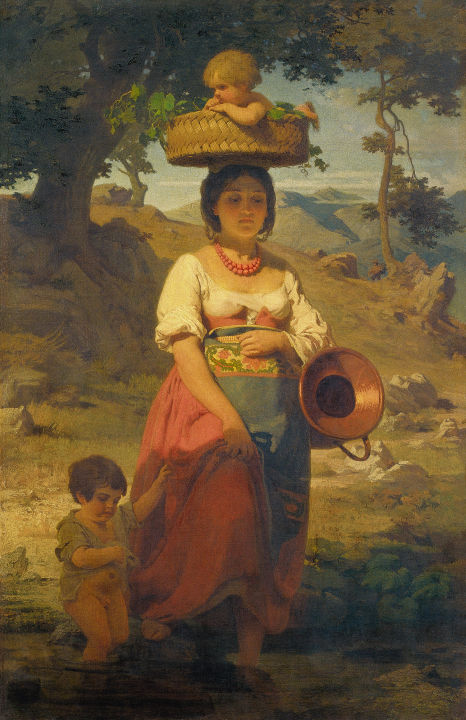
Italian Woman with Children by a Stream, 1862

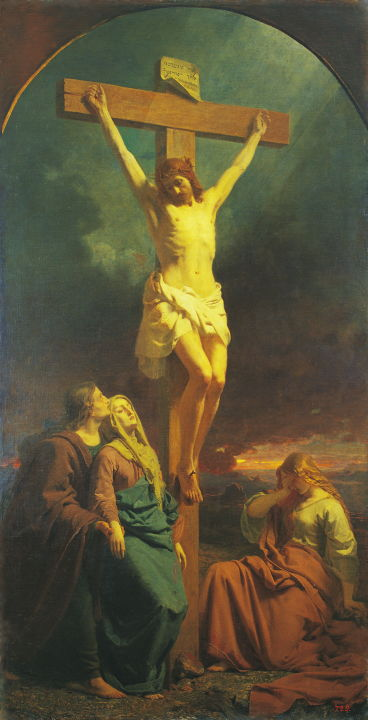
Christ of the Cross, 1857–1859

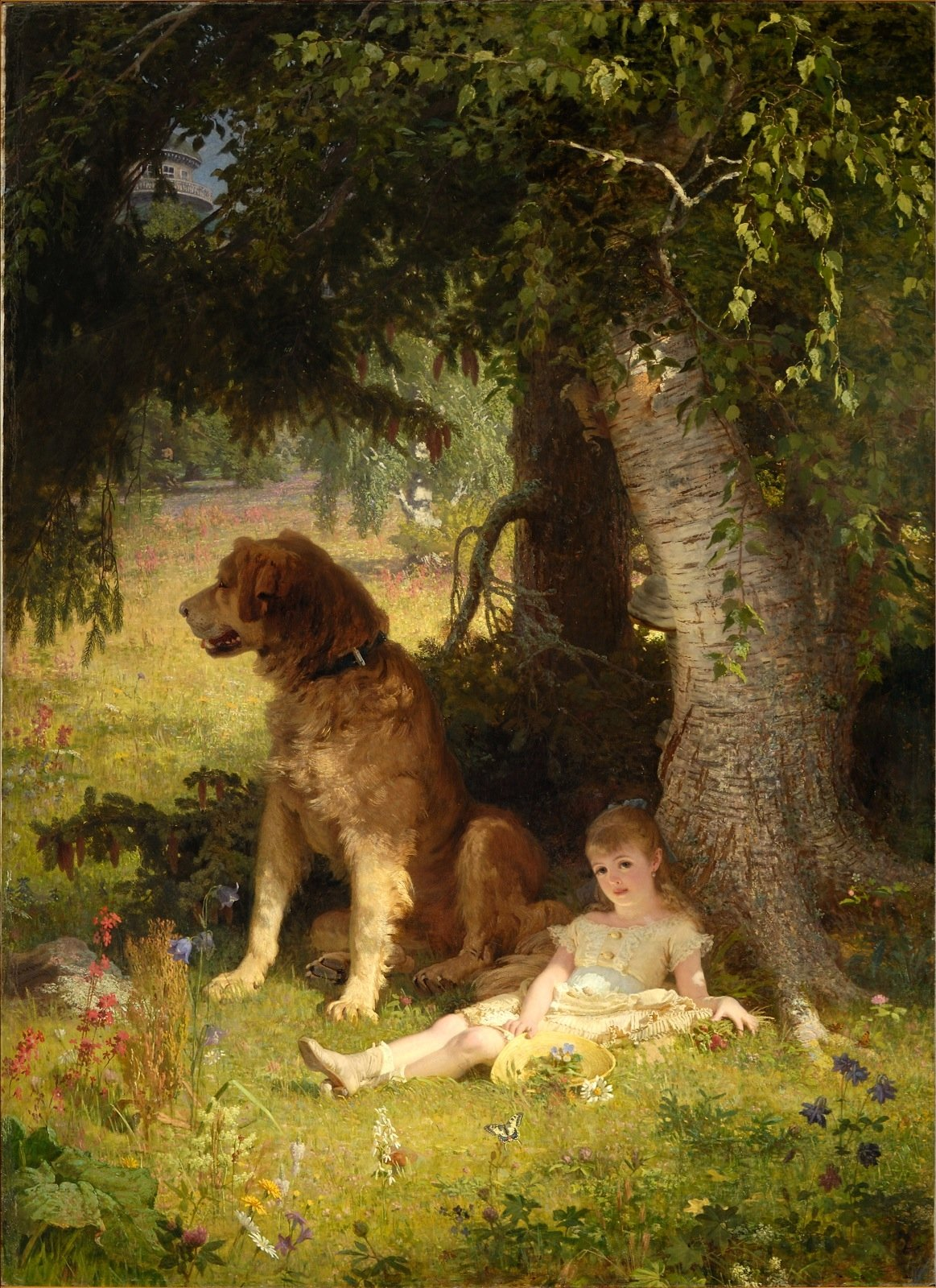
Faithful Guardian, 1878

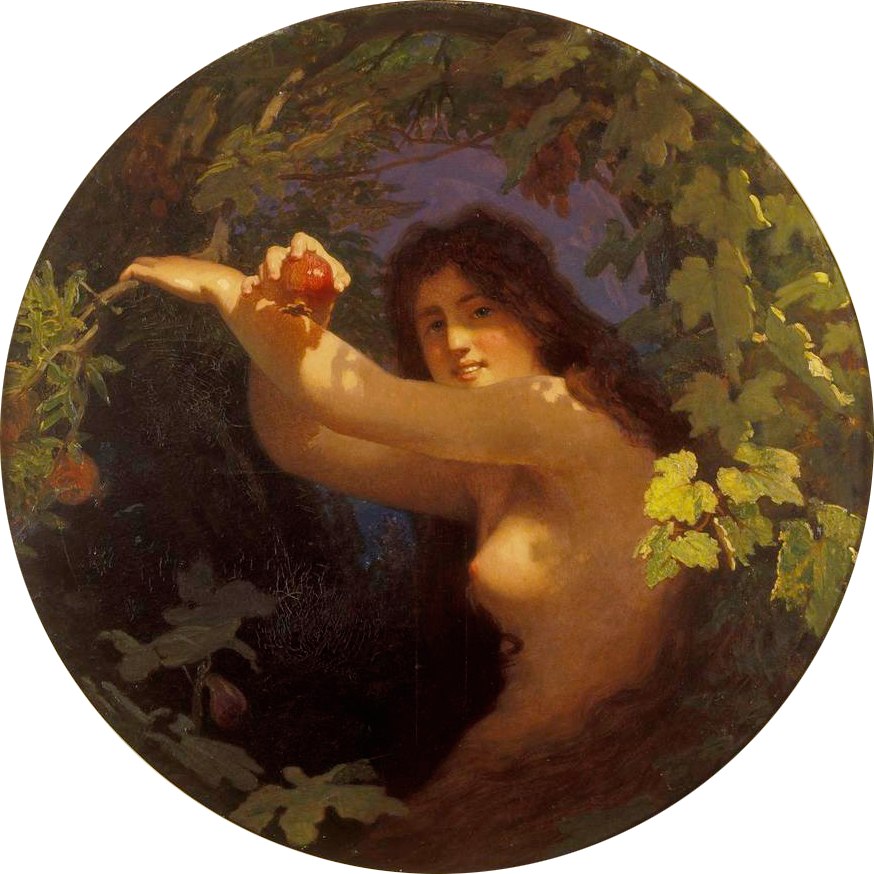
Eve with Pomegranate, 1879-1880

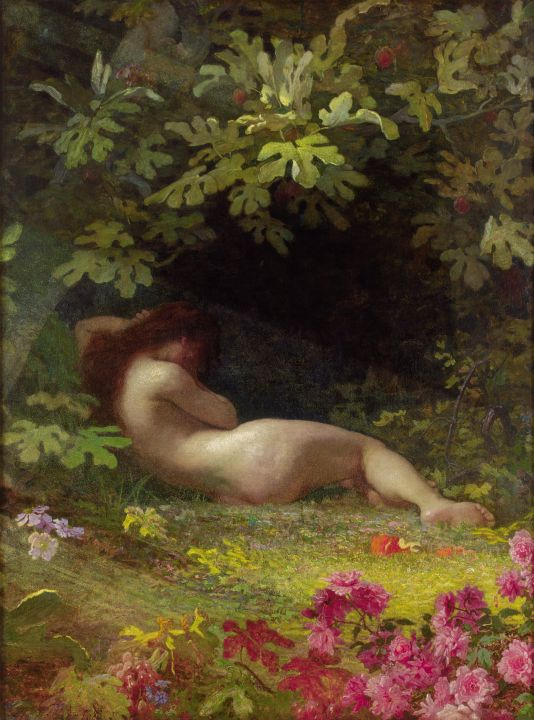
Eve after Falling Into Sin, 1883

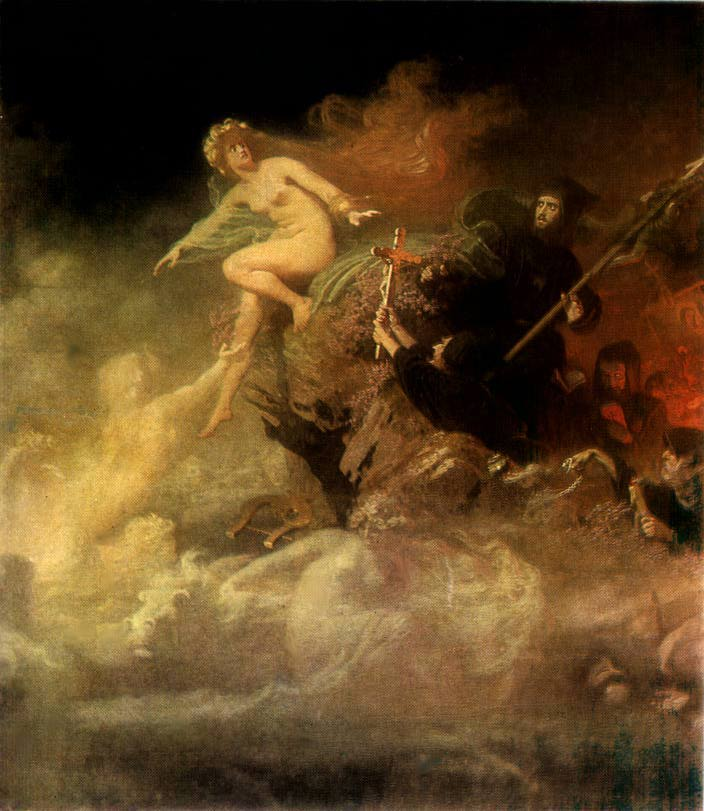
Lorelei Cursed by Monks, 1887
