= Jacob von Sievers =

Russian statesman (1731–1808)

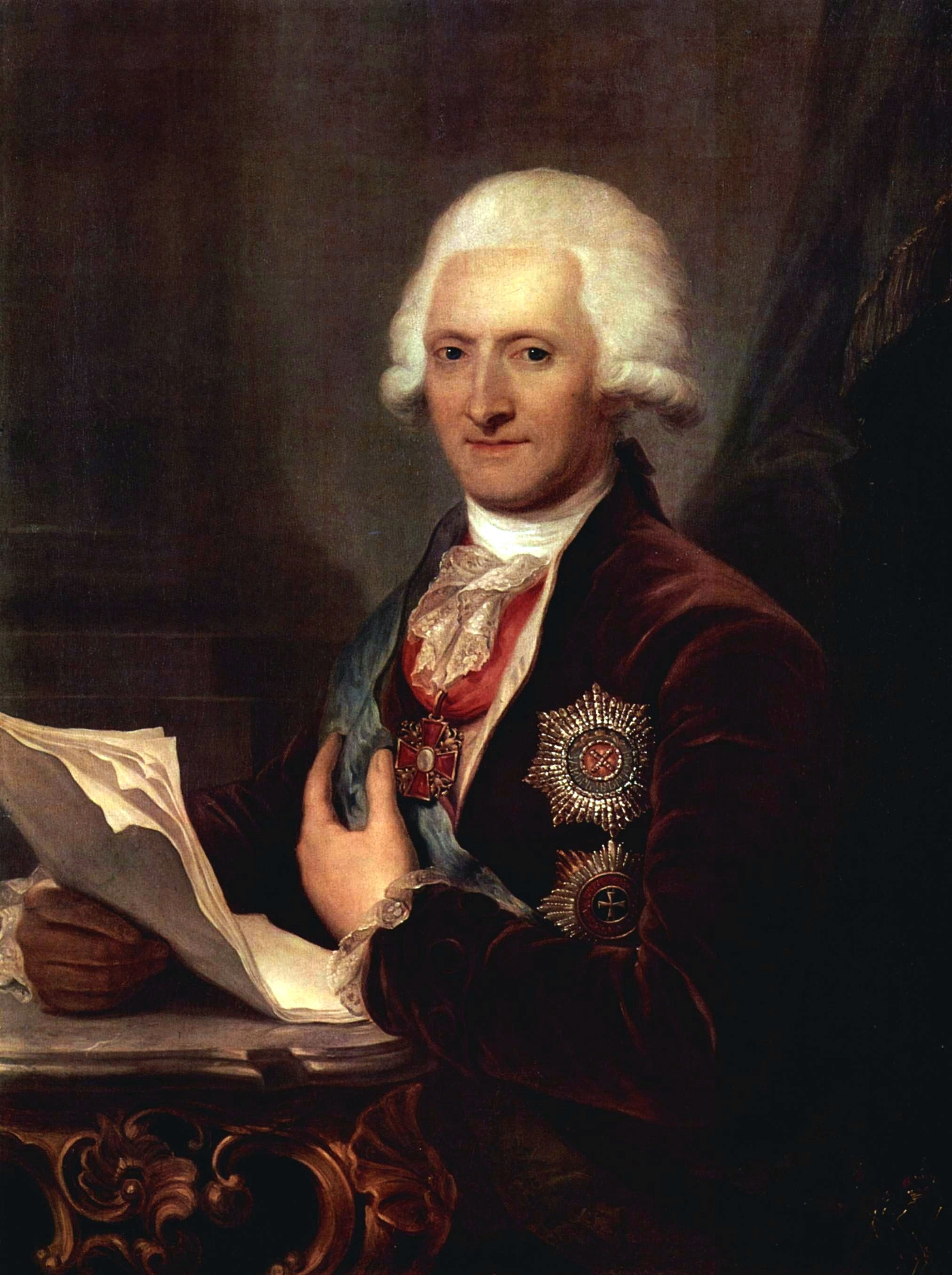
- Portrait by Josef Grassi, 1790–1795

Personal details
- Born: 30 August 1731 Wesenberg, Governorate of Estonia, Russian Empire
- Died: 23 July 1808 (aged 76) Bauenhof, Governorate of Livonia, Russian Empire

Military service
- Allegiance: Russia
- Battles/wars: Seven Years' War; Battle of Gross-Jägersdorf; Battle of Zorndorf

Jacob Johann Graf von Sievers (Russian: Я́ков Ефи́мович Си́верс, romanized: Yakov Yefimovich Sivers; 30 August 1731 – 23 July 1808) was a Russian statesman of Baltic German origin. He was from the Sievers family, originating in Livonia. From 1764 to 1781, he served as the governor of Novgorod.

== Biography ==
He was born into the family of a Livonian nobleman. At the age of 12, he was moved to St. Petersburg by his uncle, whose daughter he later married. Sievers worked as a scribe in the Collegium of Foreign Affairs and later served in the Russian embassies in Denmark and Britain.

During the Seven Years' War, he served in the Russian army as quartermaster general and participated in the battles of Gross-Jägersdorf and Zorndorf. He was then appointed governor of Novgorod in 1764 by Catherine II and he held that position until 1781. Catherine accepted many of his proposals after he wrote a report and insisted on the demarcation of lands and the creation of an agricultural society. As a result, he was one of the founders of the Free Economic Society. He also introduced the cultivation of potatoes to Russia, regulated the postal services, and was instrumental in the abolition of torture in 1767.

Based on Sievers' initiative, the provincial government reform was instituted; he was himself appointed general governor of Novgorod, Tver and Pskov. He was Russian ambassador to Poland and led the second and third partition of the kingdom. Emperor Paul I of Russia appointed him senator in 1796; in 1797 he became head of the new department for water communications. He was knighted in 1798.

In Sievers' honor, Alexander I named the channel that connects the outlet of the Msta River with the Volkhov river the Sievers Canal.

== Sources ==
- "Сиверс, Яков-Иоанн (Яков Ефимович)" . Brockhaus and Efron Encyclopedic Dictionary (in Russian). 1906.
- Blum, Karl Ludwig: Ein russischer Staatsmann, Denkwürdigkeiten des Grafen von Sievers, Leipzig 1857–58, 4 vols.
- Blum, Karl Ludwig: Graf Jacob Johann von Sievers und Russland zu dessen Zeit. Leipzig; Heidelberg: Winter, 1864
- Jones, Robert E: Provincial Development in Russia. Catherine II and Jacob Sievers. Rutgers University Press, 1984
- Kamenskii, Alexander (15 September 2020). "Sievers, Jacob Johann von (Yakov Efimovich)". Catherine the Great: A Reference Guide to Her Life and Works. Bloomsbury Publishing PLC. pp. 126–127. ISBN 978-1-5381-3028-5.

Preceded by Zakhar Chernyshev	Governor General of Pskov; 1777–1781	Succeeded by Nikolai Repnin
Preceded by Position established	Governor General of Novgorod and Tver; 1776–1781	Succeeded by James Bruce
