= Clement Clarke Moore (clubman) =

American architect, soldier and clubman

- Born: September 18, 1843; Ossining, New York, U.S.
- Died: December 15, 1910 (aged 67); Manhattan, New York, U.S.
- Spouse: Laura Martha Williams (m. 1879)
- Children: 5, including Barrington
- Parent(s): Benjamin Moore; Mary Elizabeth Sing Moore
- Relatives: Clement C. Moore (grandfather); Barrington Moore Jr. (grandson)

Clement Clarke Moore (September 18, 1843 – December 15, 1910) was an American architect and soldier who was prominent in New York society during the Gilded Age.

== Early life ==
Moore was born in Ossining in Westchester County on September 18, 1843. He was the son of Benjamin Moore (1818–1886) and Mary Elizabeth (née Sing) Moore (1820–1895). His younger siblings were brother Casimir de Rham Moore, (Note: Clement's brother, Casimir de Rham Moore (b. 1851), a lawyer, was named after Henry Casimir de Rham (1785–1873), a Swiss–American merchant and diplomat (of "de Rham, Iselin & Moore"), who married Maria Moore (1784–1855), the daughter of Dr. William Moore (brother of Bishop Benjamin Moore and his wife Jane (née Fish) Moore.) and sister Katherine T. Moore.

His father was the eldest son of Catharine (née Taylor) Moore and Clement Clarke Moore, today known as the author of the Christmas poem "A Visit from St. Nicholas". (Note: "A Visit from St. Nicholas", first published anonymously in 1823, later became widely known as "'Twas the Night Before Christmas".) His paternal grandfather was the son of Bishop Benjamin Moore, the head of the Episcopal Diocese of New York and President of Columbia University. His paternal grandmother was a descendant of the Van Cortlandt family. His aunt Margaret Moore, and after her death, his aunt, Mary Clarke Moore, were married to John Doughty Ogden of the Ogden family. (Note: John Doughty Ogden (1804–1887) was a grandson of U.S. Attorney Abraham Ogden and nephew of U.S. Representative David A. Ogden.) His father's first cousin, Nathaniel Fish Moore, also served as president of Columbia University from 1842 to 1849.

== Career ==
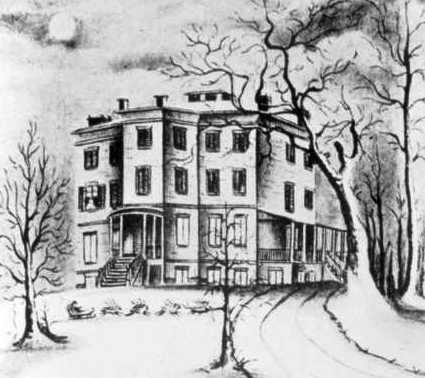
The Moore Mansion in the family's Chelsea estate, painted by Moore aunt, Mary Clarke (née Moore) Ogden, in 1855.

During the Civil War, Moore was a captain in the 20th Massachusetts Infantry in the Union Army. After the war, he became a companion of the New York Commandery of the Military Order of the Loyal Legion of the United States.

Following the War, he was a cotton broker until he received his share of his grandfather's estate in 1901, at which point he moved to Paris with his family.

=== Chelsea estate ===
Moore inherited his grandfather's estate, named Chelsea, located on the west side of the island of Manhattan above Houston Street, which was mostly open countryside before the 1820s. It had been owned by his grandfather's maternal grandfather, Maj. Thomas Clarke, a retired British veteran of the French and Indian War (the North American front of the Seven Years' War). Clarke named his house for the Royal Hospital Chelsea in London that served war veterans.

His grandfather inherited the property from his mother, Charity Clarke Moore in 1813. In 1883, the elder Moore was offered $40,000 for the Chelsea farm. He seriously considered selling, but decided to keep the property and its value grew exponentially as the area developed. The estate was later passed down to his father, Benjamin Moore, and then to Moore and his family upon his father's death. The contemporary Manhattan neighborhood is known as Chelsea after his estate.

=== Society life ===
In 1892, Moore and his wife were both included in Ward McAllister's "Four Hundred", purported to be an index of New York's best families, published in The New York Times. Conveniently, 400 was the number of people that could fit into Mrs. Astor's ballroom. Mrs. Moore was "the first society woman to ride a bicycle in Newport." Moore owned a summer "cottage" on Catherine Street in Newport, Rhode Island.

== Personal life ==
In 1879, Moore was married to Laura Martha Williams (1856–1919). Laura was the daughter of William S. Williams of New York City and Mrs. Martha Church Williams, of Philadelphia. In New York, they lived at 57 East 54th Street, and in Paris, they lived at 82 Avenue Monceau. Together, Clement and Laura were the parents of:

- Mary Elizabeth Moore (1879–1883), who died young.
- Clement Clark Moore (1881–1883), who died young.
- William Scoville Moore (1882–1944), a real estate dealer and an organizer with President Franklin D. Roosevelt of the Warm Springs Foundation in Georgia and who married Edith Pulitzer (1886–1975), daughter of Joseph Pulitzer, in 1911.
- Barrington Moore Sr. (Note: The name Barrington came from William Barrington, 3rd Viscount Barrington, who married Maria-Theresa Clarke (sister of Charity Clarke and sister-in-law of Clement Clarke Moore), both of whom were lost at sea in 1801.) (1883–1966), a forester who was married to Muriel Hennen Morris, the daughter of Frances Isabel Morris (then wife of Lewis Cass Ledyard) and Thurlow Weed Barnes, (Note: Muriel's aunt was photographer Catharine Weed Barnes and her great-grandfather was publisher Thurlow Weed. Her maternal grandfather was John Albert Morris, a prominent figure in the sport of thoroughbred horse racing, and her uncles were Alfred Hennen Morris and Dave Hennen Morris.) in 1910.
- Benjamin Moore (1886–1938), who married Alexandra Emery (1894–1983), sister of Lela, Audrey, Thomas, and John Emery, (Note: Alexandra's sisters were Audrey Emery (1904–1971) (married to Grand Duke Dmitri Pavlovich of Russia and after their divorce, Georgian Prince Dimitri Djordjadze) and Lela Emery (1901–1962) (married to Alastair Mackintosh and Hély Talleyrand-Périgord, the 4th Marquis de Talleyrand, 7th Duc de Talleyrand et Dino).) in 1920. After his death in 1938, she remarried to Robert McKay.

A month after his wife suffered a stroke of paralysis, Moore died of pneumonia at the Hotel Belmont in New York City on December 15, 1910. After a funeral held at St. Bartholomew's Episcopal Church, he was buried at Dale Cemetery in Ossining. His wife, who later lived at 960 Park Avenue in New York City, died in Saratoga Springs, New York in 1919.

=== Descendants ===
Through his son William, he was the grandfather of four boys, Adrian P. Moore, David E. Moore (1923–2011), Richard Moore, and William S. Moore Jr., the last two both died in World War II.

Through his son Barrington, he was the grandfather of Barrington Moore Jr. (1913–2005), a political sociologist known for his work Social Origins of Dictatorship and Democracy: Lord and Peasant in the Making of the Modern World, and Dr. Peter Van Cortlandt Moore (c. 1920–2006), a physician who was a professor of psychiatry at Georgetown University Hospital.

Through his son Benjamin, he was the grandfather of Alexander Moore (1923–2000), a Harvard graduate and decorated World War II fighter pilot.
