= Clement Clarke Moore =

American writer and professor (1779–1863)

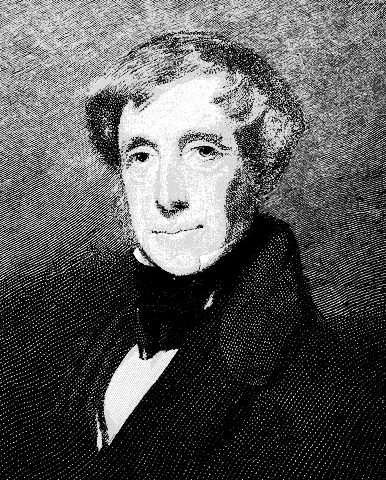
- Born: July 15, 1779; New York City, Province of New York, British America
- Died: July 10, 1863 (aged 83); Newport, Rhode Island, U.S.
- Education: Columbia University (BA, MA)
- Spouse: Catharine Elizabeth Taylor (m. 1813; died 1830)
- Parent(s): Benjamin Moore; Charity Clarke Moore

Clement Clarke Moore (July 15, 1779 – July 10, 1863) was an American writer, scholar and real estate developer. He is best known as author of the Christmas poem "A Visit from St. Nicholas", which first named each of Santa Claus's reindeer.

Moore was Professor of Oriental and Greek Literature, as well as Divinity and Biblical Learning, at the General Theological Seminary of the Protestant Episcopal Church, in New York City. The seminary was developed on land donated by Moore and it continues on this site at Ninth Avenue between 20th and 21st streets, in an area known as Chelsea Square. Moore gained considerable wealth by subdividing and developing other parts of his large inherited estate in what became known as the residential neighborhood of Chelsea. He also served for 44 years as a member of the board of trustees of Columbia College (later University), and was a board member of the New York Society Library and the New York Institution for the Blind.

"A Visit from St. Nicholas," which later became widely known by its opening line, "'Twas the Night Before Christmas," was first published anonymously in 1823. Moore publicly claimed authorship in 1837, and this was not disputed during his lifetime, but a rival claimant emerged later and scholars now debate the identity of the author, calling on textual and handwriting analysis as well as other historical sources.

== Early life and education ==
Moore was born on July 15, 1779, in New York City, at "Chelsea", his mother's family estate. He was the son of Benjamin Moore (1748–1816) and Charity (née Clarke) Moore (1747–1838). At the time of Clement's birth Benjamin Moore was assistant rector of Trinity Church in Manhattan. He later became rector of Trinity and bishop of the Episcopal Diocese of New York, also serving as acting president of Kings College in 1775 and 1776 and president of the renamed Columbia College (now Columbia University) from 1801 to 1811.

Moore's maternal grandfather was Major Thomas Clarke, an English officer who stayed in the colony after fighting in the French and Indian War. He owned the large Manhattan estate "Chelsea", then in the country north of the developed areas of the city. As a girl, Moore's mother Charity Clarke wrote letters to her English cousins. Preserved at Columbia University, these show her disdain for the policies of the British monarchy and her growing sense of patriotism in pre-Revolutionary days. Moore's grandmother Sarah Fish was a descendant of Elizabeth Fones and Joris Woolsey, one of the earlier settlers of Manhattan. Moore's parents inherited the Chelsea estate, and deeded it to him in 1813. He got great wealth by subdividing and developing it in the 19th century.

Moore received a Bachelor of Arts from Columbia College as valedictorian of the class of 1798, a Master of Arts in 1801, and an honorary Doctor of Laws (LLD) in 1829.

== Career ==
One of Moore's earliest known works was an anonymous pro-Federalist pamphlet published prior to the 1804 presidential election, attacking the religious and racial views of Thomas Jefferson (the incumbent president and Democratic-Republican candidate). His polemic, titled in full "Observations upon Certain Passages in Mr. Jefferson's Notes on Virginia, which Appear to Have a Tendency to Subvert Religion, and Establish a False Philosophy," depicted Jefferson's Notes on the State of Virginia (1785) as an "instrument of infidelity" that "debases the negro to an order of creatures lower than those who have a fairer skin and thinner lips."

In 1820, Moore helped Trinity Church organize a new parish church, St. Luke in the Fields, on Hudson Street. He later gave 66 tracts of land – the apple orchard from his inherited Chelsea estate – to the Episcopal Diocese of New York to be the site of the General Theological Seminary.

Based likely on this donation, and on the publication of his Hebrew and English Lexicon in 1809, Moore was appointed as professor of Biblical learning at the Seminary. He held this post until 1850.

After the seminary was built, Moore began the residential development of his Chelsea estate in the 1820s with the help of James N. Wells, dividing it into lots along Ninth Avenue and selling them to well-heeled New Yorkers. Covenants in the deeds of sale created a planned neighborhood, specifying what could be built on the land as well as architectural details of the buildings. Stables, manufacturing and commercial uses were forbidden in the development.

Moore was appointed to the Columbia College board of trustees in 1813 and served until 1857. He was clerk of the board from 1815 to 1850. From 1840 to 1850, Moore also served as a board member of the New York Institution for the Blind at 34th Street and Ninth Avenue (now the New York Institute for Special Education). He published a collection of poems (1844).

=== A Visit from St. Nicholas ===
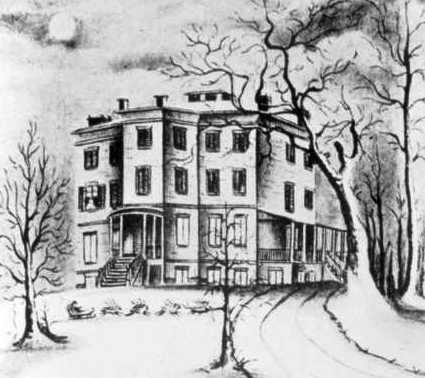
A rendering of the mansion house of the Chelsea estate by Moore's daughter, Mary C. Ogden, made for the first color edition of A Visit from St. Nicholas (1855)

This poem, "arguably the best-known verses ever written by an American," was first published anonymously in the Troy, New York Sentinel on December 23, 1823. It had been given to the paper's editor by Sarah Sackett of Troy, who probably got it from Harriet Butler of Troy, a family friend of the Moores.

Anonymous or pseudonymous publication of poetry was customary at the time, but as the poem's popularity grew so did curiosity about its author. In response to a query in 1829, Sentinel editor Orville Holley wrote that "We have been given to understand that the author ... belongs by birth and residence to the city of New York, and that he is a gentleman of more merit as a scholar and a writer than many of more noisy pretensions." (Italics his.)

In 1837 Moore was finally publicly identified as the author in journalist Charles Fenno Hoffman's The New-York Book of Poetry, to which Moore had submitted several poems. In 1844, he included "Visit" in Poems, an anthology of his works. His children, for whom he had originally written the piece, encouraged this publication. In 1855, Mary C. Moore Ogden, one of the Moores' married daughters, painted "illuminations" to go with the first color edition of the poem.

=== Authorship controversy ===
Scholars have debated whether Moore was the author of this poem. Professor Donald Foster used textual content analysis and external evidence to argue that Moore could not have been the author. Foster proposed that Major Henry Livingston, Jr., a New Yorker with Dutch and Scottish roots, should be considered the chief candidate for authorship. This view was long espoused by the Livingston family. Livingston was distantly related to Moore's wife.

In response to Foster's claim, Stephen Nissenbaum, professor of history at the University of Massachusetts, wrote in 2001 that, based on his research, Moore was the author. In his article, "There Arose Such a Clatter: Who Really Wrote 'The Night before Christmas'? (And Why Does It Matter?)", Nissenbaum confirmed Moore's authorship, "I believe he did, and I think I have marshaled an array of good evidence to prove [it]".

Foster's claim has also been countered by document dealer and historian Seth Kaller, who once owned one of Moore's original manuscripts of the poem. Kaller has offered a point-by-point rebuttal of both Foster's linguistic analysis and external findings, buttressed by the work of autograph expert James Lowe and Dr. Joe Nickell, author of Pen, Ink and Evidence.

There is no evidence that Livingston ever claimed authorship, nor has any record ever been found of any printing of the poem with Livingston's name attached to it. As first published in The Sentinel, the names of Santa's last two reindeer in the poem were Dunder and Blixem, and Foster argued the change to Donder and Blitzen in later versions was evidence of tampering by Moore with the "perfectly correct Dutch" of Livingston. But donder is the correct Dutch word for thunder, and the phrase was used by multiple English and American authors with a variety of different spellings in the late 1700s and early 1800s.

In 2016, the matter was discussed by MacDonald P. Jackson, an emeritus professor of English literature at the University of Auckland, a fellow of the Royal Society of New Zealand and an expert in authorship attribution using statistical techniques. He evaluated every argument using modern computational stylistics, including one never used before – statistical analysis of phonemes – and found, in his opinion, that in every test that Livingston was the more likely author.

Subsequent analyses using forensic linguistics techniques developed by computer scientists have come to the opposite conclusion. In his 2023 book The Fight for "The Night": Resolving the Authorship Dispute over "The Night Before Christmas," retired litigator Tom A. Jerman reported using Duquesne University computer scientist Patrick Juola's Java Graphical Authorship Attribution Program to compare the poem to the works of Moore and Livingston, with 16 of 17 tests pointing to Moore as the likelier author. That year, computer scientist Shlomo Argamon, then of the Illinois Institute of Technology, also analyzed the poem alongside texts from Moore, Livingston and five other authors of the era and concluded that “Moore is much more likely to be the author than Livingston,” and “it’s more likely authored by either Moore or Livingston than any of the other guys.”

=== Developing Chelsea ===
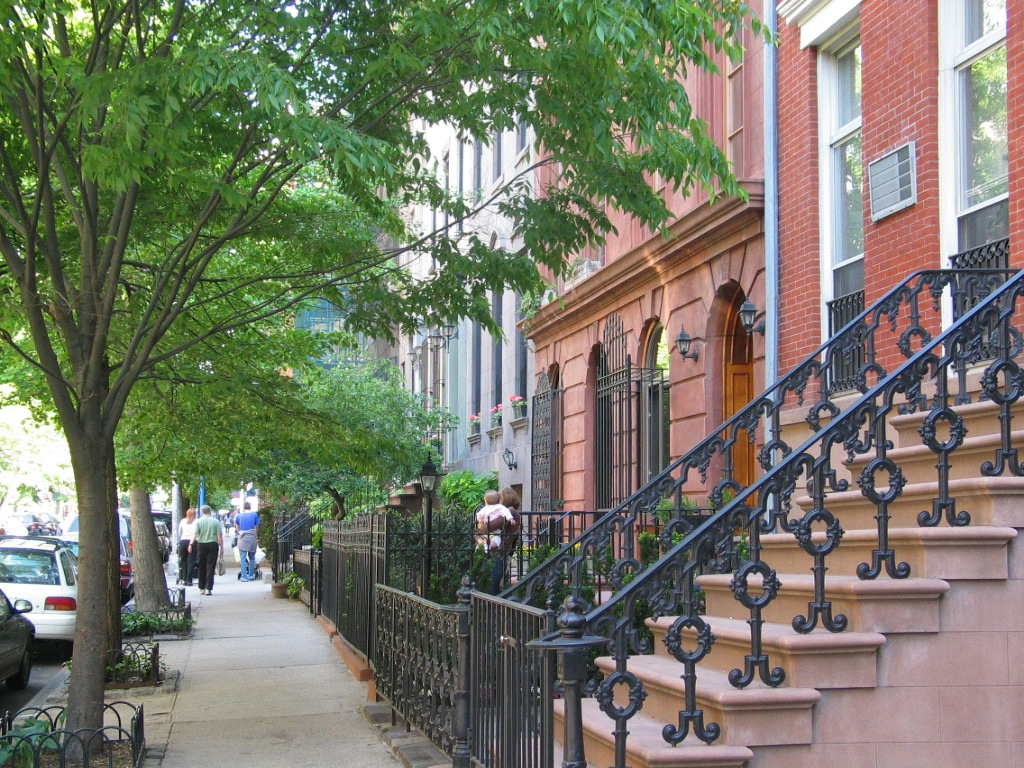
Townhouses in Manhattan's Chelsea neighborhood, most of which was originally part of Moore's country estate

Moore's estate, named Chelsea, was on the west side of the island of Manhattan north of Greenwich Village. It was mostly open countryside before the 1820s. It had been purchased in 1750 by his maternal grandfather Maj. Thomas Clarke, a retired British veteran of the French and Indian War (the North American front of the Seven Years' War). Clarke named his house for the Royal Hospital Chelsea in London that served war veterans. Moore's parents inherited the estate in 1802, and several years later they deeded it to him.

When the government of New York City decided on a street grid in Manhattan, based on the Commissioner's Plan of 1811, the new Ninth Avenue was projected to go through the middle of the Chelsea estate. In 1818, Moore wrote and published a pamphlet calling on other "Proprietors of Real Estate" to oppose the manner in which the city was being developed. He thought it was a conspiracy designed to increase political patronage and appease the city's working class, and argued that making landowners bear the costs of the streets laid through their property was "a tyranny no monarch in Europe would dare to exercise." He also criticized the grid plan and the flattening of hills as ill-advised.

Despite his protests, Moore was already preparing to develop Chelsea, acquiring adjacent plots of land from relatives and neighbors until he owned everything from Eighth Avenue to the Hudson River between 19th and 24th Streets. Together with carpenter-builder James N. Wells he divided the neighborhood into lots and marketed them to well-heeled New Yorkers. He donated a large block of land to the Episcopal diocese for construction of a seminary, giving them an apple orchard consisting of 66 tracts. Construction began in 1827 for the General Theological Seminary. Based on his knowledge of Hebrew, Moore was appointed as its first professor of Oriental Languages, serving until 1850.

The seminary continues to operate on the same site, taking up most of the block between 20th and 21st streets and Ninth and Tenth avenues. Ten years later, Moore gave land at 20th Street and Ninth, east of the avenue, to the diocese for construction of St. Peter's Episcopal Church. The contemporary Manhattan neighborhood is known as Chelsea after his estate. The High Line Hotel, which opened in 2013, occupies the former dormatory of the Seminary.

== Personal life ==
In 1813, Moore married Catherine Elizabeth Taylor, daughter of William Taylor and Elizabeth (née Van Cortlandt) Taylor. William Taylor was a New Jersey lawyer who had served as chief justice of Jamaica. Elizabeth Van Cortlandt was a direct descendant of Stephanus Van Cortlandt, the first native-born mayor of New York City and first patroon of Van Cortlandt Manor, as well as the niece by marriage of Sir Edward Buller, 1st Baronet. Together, Catherine and Clement Moore were the parents of nine children:

- Margaret Elliot Moore (1815–1845), who married John Doughty Ogden (1804–1887), a grandson of U.S. Attorney Abraham Ogden and nephew of U.S. Representative David A. Ogden.
- Charity Elizabeth Moore (1816–1830), who died young.
- Benjamin Moore (1818–1886), who married Mary Elizabeth Sing (1820–1895), in 1842, and was the father of Clement Clarke Moore, grandfather of Barrington Moore Sr., and great grandfather of Barrington Moore Jr.
- Mary Clarke Moore (1819–1893), who married John Doughty Ogden, her older sister's widower, in 1848. They were the parents of Mary Moore Ogden (1856–1933), second wife of Marquess Claes Lagergren.
- Clement Moore (1821–1889), who did not marry.
- Emily Moore (1822–1828), who also died young.
- William Taylor Moore (1823-1897), who married Lucretia Post in 1857 and, after her death in 1872, Katherine E. Robinson. He had no children.
- Catharine Van Cortlandt Moore (1825–1890), who did not marry.
- Maria Theresa ("Terry") Barrington Moore (1826–1900), who did not marry.

After spending a month in their company in the resort town of Sharon Springs, New York, in 1848, the acerbic diarist George Templeton Strong described the unmarried Moore children as, "the sons a compound of imbecility deep beyond all fathoming, with an appetite for chambermaids beyond all precedent—the two Miss M’s very nice indeed." In the 1850s, Moore began summering in Newport, Rhode Island, together with his daughters Terry and Mary, and Mary's family. He died on July 10, 1863, at his summer residence on Catherine Street in Newport, five days before his 84th birthday. His funeral was held in Trinity Church, Newport, where he had owned a pew. His body was returned to New York for burial in the cemetery at St. Luke in the Fields. On November 29, 1899, his body was reinterred in Trinity Church Cemetery in New York.

=== Legacy and honors ===
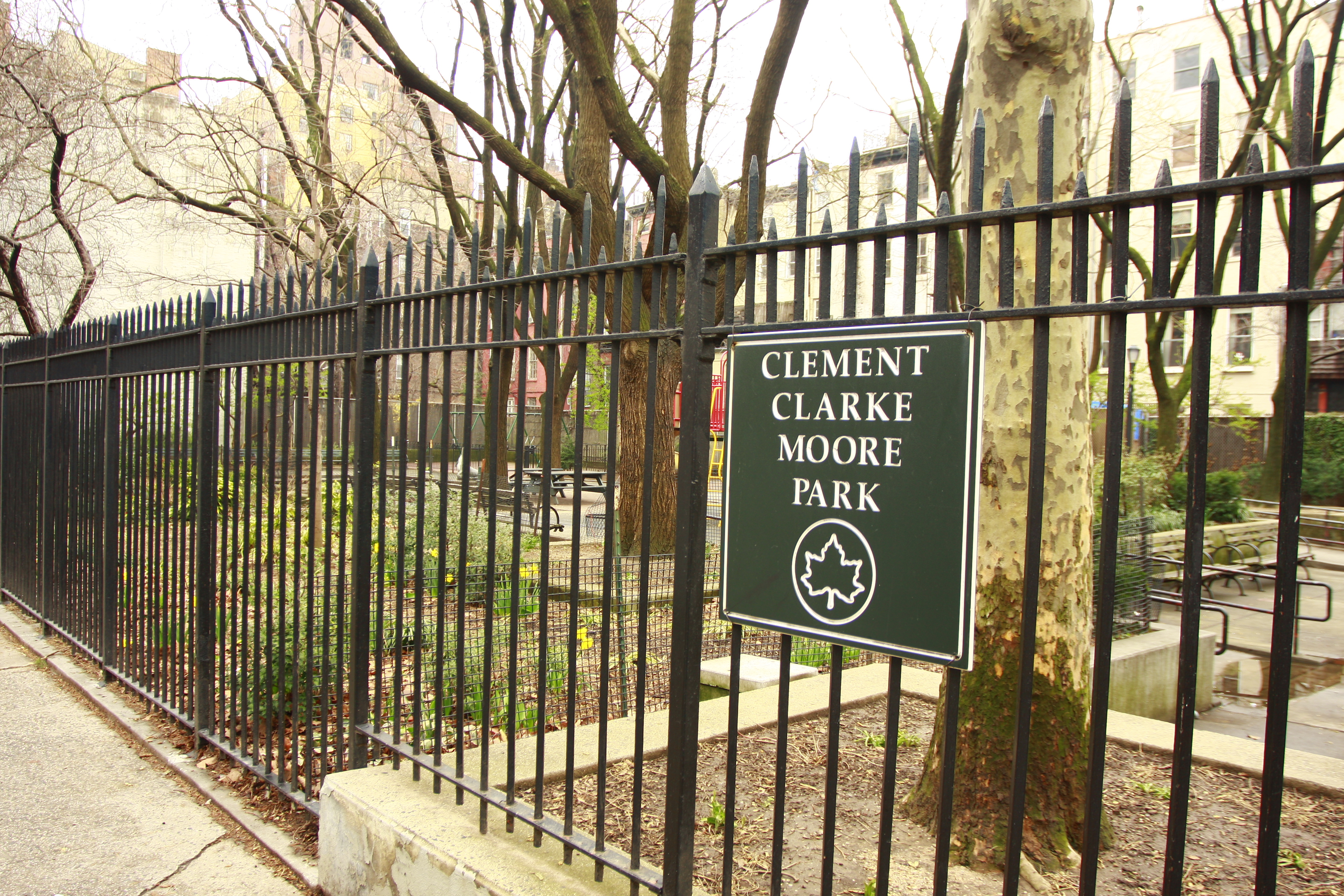
Clement Clarke Moore Park at 10th Avenue and 22nd Street in Manhattan, New York City

- In 1911, the Church of the Intercession in Manhattan started a service on the Sunday before Christmas that included a reading of the poem followed by a procession to Moore's tomb at Trinity Church Cemetery on the Sunday before Christmas. This continues until this day.
- Clement Clarke Moore Park, located at 10th Avenue and 22nd Street in Chelsea, is named after Moore.
- A playground opened in the park on November 22, 1968, and was named for Moore by local law the following year. In 1995 it was fully renovated, and new trees were added. Local residents gather annually there on the last Sunday of Advent for a reading of "Twas the Night Before Christmas".
- PS13 in Elmhurst, Queens, is named after Clement C. Moore.

== See also ==
- Santa Claus's reindeer
