= Paul Ilyinsky =

Three time Mayor of Palm Beach (1928–2004)

- Born: January 27, 1928; 26 Manchester Square, London, England, United Kingdom
- Died: February 10, 2004 (aged 76); Palm Beach, Florida, U.S.
- Education: Woodberry Forest School; Royal Military Academy Sandhurst; University of Virginia (1953)
- Title: Prince Paul Dimitrievich Romanovsky-Ilyinsky
- Spouses: Mary Evelyn Prince (m. 1949; ann. 1951); Angelica Philippa Kauffmann (m. 1952)
- Children: 4
- Parents: Grand Duke Dmitri Pavlovich of Russia (father); Audrey Emery (mother)
- Family: Ilyinsky

Paul Dmitrievich Romanovsky-Ilyinsky (January 27, 1928 – February 10, 2004) was a three-time mayor of Palm Beach, Florida, and the only child of Grand Duke Dmitri Pavlovich of Russia and his morganatic wife, Cincinnati heiress Audrey Emery. He was a great-grandson of Tsar Alexander II of Russia and, following the death of Grand Duke Vladimir Kirillovich in 1992, the heir-male of the Ilyinsky claim of the House of Romanov (a position now held by his elder son), a first cousin once removed of Nicholas II, first cousin of Prince Lennart of Sweden, Duke of Småland (owner and inhabitant of the Isle of Mainau in the Lake Constance, Baden-Württemberg, Germany) and the second cousin of Charles III.

== Early life ==
Prince Paul Romanovsky-Ilyinsky was born on 27 January 1928 at his parents' home, 26 Manchester Square, London. His father, Grand Duke Dmitri, as a direct consequence of his involvement in the murder of Grigori Rasputin in 1916, had been sent to the Persian front, which ultimately saved his life, as many of his Imperial relatives were executed by the Bolsheviks during the October Revolution. Dmitri, who was working as a champagne salesman, married in Biarritz, France, Cincinnati heiress Audrey Emery in 1926. Grand Duke Cyril Vladimirovich of Russia, Dmitri's cousin and the self-proclaimed emperor in exile, elevated Grand Duke Dmitri's wife and their descendants to Russian princely (Russian: knyaz) rank (rank of nobility, not royalty). Any children the couple would have would be known as Romanovsky-Ilyinsky, the latter half of the surname derived from Dmitri's former property in Russia, Ilinskoe.

Ilynskiy's parents were divorced in 1937, and Ilyinsky was raised by his mother, who mostly lived in France. That same year, she married her second husband, Prince Dimitri Djordjadze, a member of a Georgian princely house; they also later divorced. Dmitri Pavlovich's health had always been somewhat frail, and in the 1930s, his chronic tuberculosis became acute, leading to his death in 1942.

== Education and career ==
Ilyinsky, who was a U.S. citizen, attended Woodberry Forest School in Virginia and the Royal Military Academy Sandhurst, England, before joining the U.S. Marine Corps. He served with distinction as a combat photographer in the Korean War and retired a lieutenant colonel. He graduated from the University of Virginia in 1953.

Ilyinsky lived in Cincinnati for about 20 years, serving on the board of the company founded by his mother's family, Emery Industries, and working as an author and photographer. In 1980, he returned to Palm Beach, Florida, where he had lived before moving to Cincinnati. He served on the Palm Beach Council for 10 years and was mayor for three terms as Republican candidate. He resigned for health reasons in 1999.

Ilyinsky died at his home in Palm Beach, Florida, on February 10, 2004.

== Personal life ==
Ilyinsky was married twice; he married his first wife, Mary Evelyn Prince in 1948 (annulment in 1951), and married his second wife, Angelica Philippa Kauffmann in 1953. Ilyinsky had four children:

- Dimitri Pavlovich Romanovsky-Ilyinsky (May 1, 1954) married Martha McDowell on September 22, 1979, and has issue:
  - Catherine (Russian Name: Екатерина) Adair Romanovsky-Ilyinsky (August 4, 1981) married Bradley Goodyear in 2013.
  - Victoria Bayard Romanovsky-Ilyinsky (November 23, 1984) married Mbeke Yves Binda in 2013.
  - Lela McDowell Romanovsky-Ilyinsky (August 26, 1986)
- Paula Maria Pavlovna Romanovsky-Ilyinsky (May 18, 1956) married Mark Comisar on May 31, 1980, and had issue:
  - Alexander Lee Comisar (April 6, 1983)
  - Makena Anna Comisar (November 20, 1984 - August 1, 2002)
- Anna Pavlovna Romanovsky-Ilyinsky (September 4, 1958) married Robin de Young on May 9, 1980 and they were divorced in 1990, with issue. She then married David Wise Glossinger, with issue:
  - Audrey Emery de Young (April 1, 1983) who is married to Cullin James Wible.
  - Heather Morrison de Young (October 25, 1985)
  - Sophia Wise Glossinger (May 5, 1993)
- Michael Pavlovich Romanovsky-Ilyinsky (November 2, 1959) married Paula Maier in 1989 and they were divorced in 1996, and has issue:
  - Alexis Vasilisa Mikhailovna Romanovsky-Ilyinsky (March 1, 1994).

== Ancestry ==
Ancestors of Paul Ilyinsky

8. Alexander II of Russia
4. Grand Duke Paul Alexandrovich of Russia
9. Princess Marie of Hesse and by Rhine
2. Grand Duke Dmitri Pavlovich of Russia
10. George I of Greece
5. Princess Alexandra of Greece and Denmark
11. Grand Duchess Olga Constantinovna of Russia
1. Prince Paul Dmitrievich Romanovsky-Ilyinsky
12. Thomas Emery
6. John Josiah Emery
13. Kezia Brown
3. Anna Audrey Emery
14. Charles Tripler Alexander
7. Lela Amelia Alexander
15. Julia Barrett
