= Boone Hall =

Historic house in South Carolina, United States

- Boone Hall Plantation
- U.S. National Register of Historic Places
- U.S. Historic district
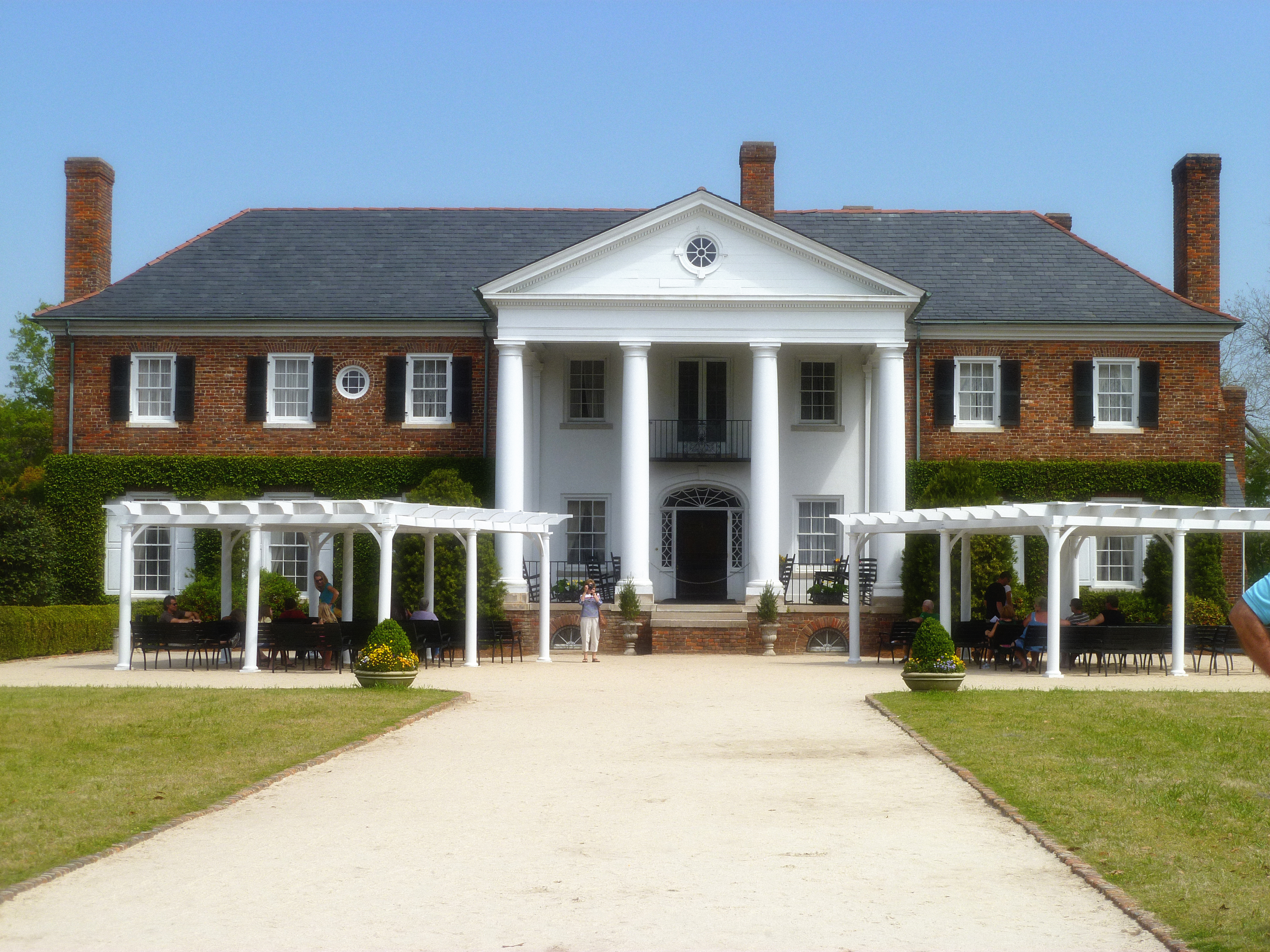
- The main house at Boone Hall

- Location within South Carolina Location within the United States
- Location: 1235 Long Point Rd Mount Pleasant, South Carolina
- Coordinates: 32°51′27.21″N 79°49′19.37″W
- Area: 738 acres (298.7 ha)
- Built: 1936 (reconstruction); 1681 (settled)
- Architect: William Harmon Beers
- Architectural style: Colonial Revival
- NRHP reference No.: 83002187 (original); 93001512 (increase)

Significant dates
- Added to NRHP: July 14, 1983
- Boundary increase: January 21, 1994

Boone Hall Plantation is a historic district located in Mount Pleasant, Charleston County, South Carolina, United States and listed on the National Register of Historic Places. The plantation is one of America's oldest plantations still in operation, as it has continually produced agricultural crops for over 320 years. The majority of this labor, as well as the construction of the buildings and its characteristic bricks, was performed by enslaved African Americans, aside from the main building, which was built in 1936. For this reason, the site was named one of the African American Historic Places in South Carolina in 2009. The historic district includes a 1936 Colonial Revival-style dwelling, and multiple significant landscape features, including an allée of southern live oak trees, believed to have been planted in 1743. The site is open for public tours.

== History ==
=== 17th and 18th centuries ===
The earliest known reference to the site is in 1681 in a land grant of 470 acres (1.9 km^{2}) from owner Theophilus Patey to his daughter Elizabeth and her new husband Major John Boone as a wedding gift. Their land became known as Boone Hall Plantation, but it is unknown when a house was built on the site. John Boone was one of the first settlers to arrive in the colony of South Carolina, doing so in 1672. Boone and his wife were ancestors of Edward Rutledge and John Rutledge, Founding Fathers of the United States.

Boone was elected to the colonial Grand Council during the 1680s, but was removed twice because he illegally trafficked enslaved Native Americans, became associated with pirates, and concealed stolen goods. He did hold other local offices, such as tax assessor and highway commissioner. When Boone died, he divided his estate among his wife and five children. His eldest son, Thomas, made Boone Hall his home. It later passed to another descendant known as John Boone.

=== 19th century ===
The Boone family owned the plantation until fourteen years after descendant John Boone's death, when his widow Sarah Gibbes Boone sold the property in 1811 to Thomas A. Vardell for $12,000 (~$263,706 in 2024). Shortly after, Henry and John Horlbeck bought the property, including the enslaved African Americans. They used a number of the enslaved workers, formerly in the fields, to make bricks. During the early 19th century, Charleston's landowners built and expanded their houses in town and along the Ashley River.

While the Horlbeck brothers have received credit for "building" many houses and public spaces in downtown Charleston using the brick from their plantations, enslaved workers had made the bricks and others accomplished the actual construction under the watch of the Horlbecks and their overseers. The work of talented slaves, with self-taught and acquired skills, including carpentry, mathematics, and geometry, were central to the construction and appearance of many Charleston-area structures. By 1850, these laborers produced 4 million bricks, by hand, per year. The fingerprints of these workers are still visible in the bricks of many of these historic sites.

The Horlbeck family oversaw the planting of the allée, the Avenue of Oaks that leads up to the plantation house. Enslaved gardeners and field laborers planted each oak in 1843, using hand tools. Similarly, the Horlbecks directed their workers to plant pecan trees on the plantation to cultivate a commodity crop. By the end of the century, Boone Hall was one of the leading producers of pecans in the United States.

When Henry Horlbeck died in 1837, several of his children settled his estate by transferring their interests in Boone Hall to four of his sons—Henry, Daniel, Edward, and John Horlbeck. The sale occurred on October 1, 1842, and described the plantation as having a "Wooden Dwelling House[,] Brick Stables[,] Barns[,] Brick Kilns[,] and buildings" on 1442 acres "commonly called and known by the name of Boone Hall."

=== 20th century ===
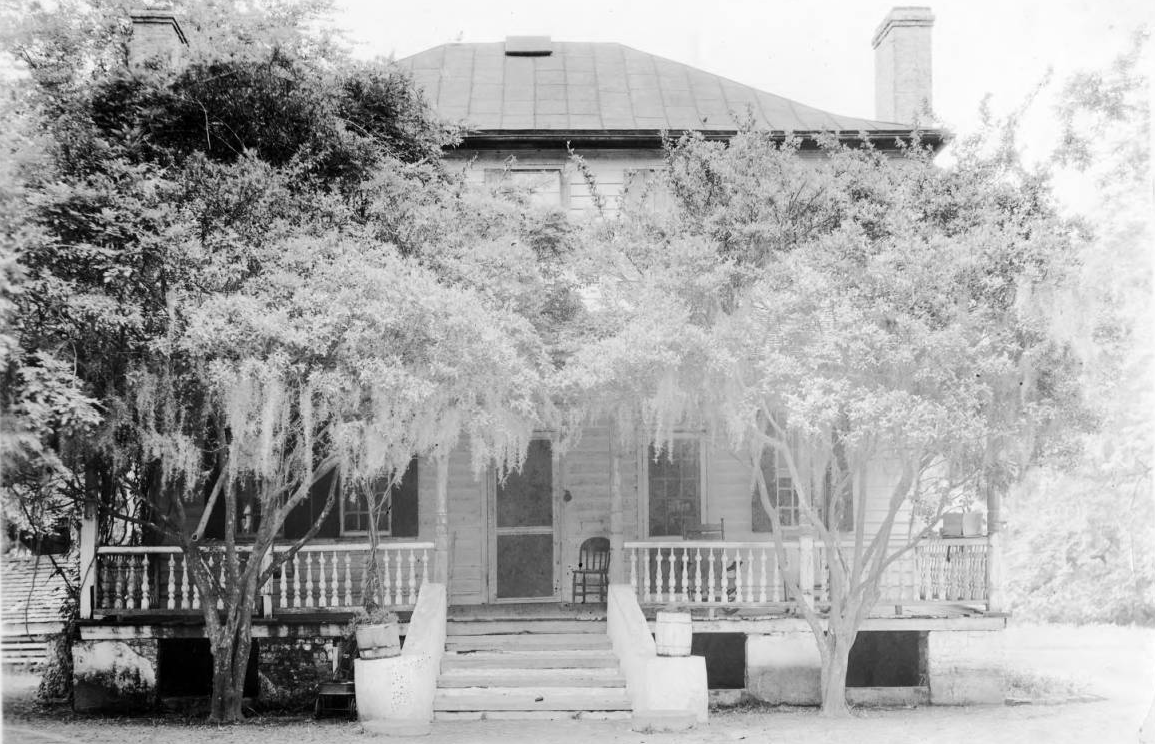
A 1900 photograph shows the former house.

Canadian Thomas Stone purchased Boone Hall Plantation in 1935 from the Horlbeck estate, coinciding with the Colonial Revival architectural era. Deciding that the surviving wooden house did not fit their idea of a southern plantation house, Stone and his wife, Alexandra, demolished the historic structure. They replaced it with a historically styled, yet modern house in 1936. The Stones focused the property's agricultural production toward the 200-acre pecan farming operation of what had been a 700-acre pecan farm. They also built an electrical plant that created power from the tides of the nearby rivers to power the plantation.

In 1940, the Stones sold the plantation to Georgian prince Dimitri Jorjadze and his wife Audrey Emery Jorjadze, an American socialite. The prince raced thoroughbreds under the nom de course, Boone Hall Stable. His most notable horse was Princequillo, who in 1943 was the fastest distance runner in the United States. The Jorjadzes sold the plantation to Dr. Henry Deas in 1945.

He sold it a decade later to Harris M. McRae and his wife Nancy in 1955. The McRaes continued to farm the land, shifting the focus to peach trees. They opened the plantation to public tours in 1956.

=== 21st century ===
Boone Hall is still owned by the McRae family, which has made great efforts to preserve the original structures and gardens. Due to its role in the antebellum south and the survival of its brick slave cabins, the site was named one of the African American Historic Places in South Carolina.

== Mansion and grounds ==
=== Architecture ===
The house at Boone Hall Plantation is modern, built during the first half of the 20th century. Thomas Stone commissioned architect William Harmon Beers to design a larger, modern residence in the Colonial Revival style. It was constructed by builder Cambridge M. Trott in 1936. Built on the gently sloping banks of Horlbeck Creek, the south-facing residence is a two-and-half story building that incorporates materials from the plantation's old farm structures, as well as salvaged historic brick recovered from the Laurel Hill Brickyard.

The eight-bay-wide facade is slightly asymmetrical, with its pedimented gable portico at the fourth, fifth and sixth bays. The portico is supported by six massive Tuscan columns, and features a bull's-eye window in the tympanum. On the ground level, the three western bays feature shuttered 9/9 windows, while the two eastern bays are slightly smaller with 6/9 windows. Within the portico are smaller 6/6 windows flanking the paneled entry door with sidelights and fanlight. Second-level window openings are slightly shorter, with a 6/6 sash. An oculus window occupies the space between the second and third bays on the western side of the facade. Above the entry is an iron balcony accessed by French doors. The lateral hipped roof has a medium pitch, with tall brick exterior chimneys at each side elevation. One interior chimney pierces the slate roof.

On the northern, rear facade, a wing of four bays projects from the eastern half of the house. The roof is hipped and has two gabled dormers on all three sides of the wing, indicating a finished attic level. Brick exterior chimneys are located at the rear and east elevations of the wing, which has 6/9 windows at both levels. There are two further projections from the rear wing. A small one-story brick wing on the north elevation, with hipped roof and exterior chimney, was originally used for farm-related storage. At the rear bay of the east elevation is a one-story, one-by-one bay frame wing, with a slate gable roof and exterior brick chimney attached to the house as an office. This small structure predates the main house, and was relocated, attached and re-sided.

Within the ell at the rear of the house, connecting the library at the front of the house with the loggia in the rear wing, is a brick paved terrace enclosed with a serpentine wall. Single and double French doors, with fanlight, in round-arched surrounds access the terrace from the library, while the west wall of the loggia opens to the terrace with a row of three French doors with sidelights and fanlights in round-arched openings. The mansion has an excavated basement with cement slab flooring, and 5'5" walls of smooth cement on which the brick exterior walls rest. Brick piers lend additional support to the main structure.

=== Interior ===
As a modern-built, classical revival/Colonial Revival structure, the interior of the historic house echoes design choices made by master builders of the 18th century. The floor plan covers about 10,000 square feet (930 m^{2}), with principal rooms located on the ground floor. The foyer has plaster walls with a double cornice at ceiling level, and flooring of teak parquet. A cantilevered winding staircase rises to the second level, lit by a triple-hung arched window with 12-light sash. To the left of the foyer is the library, accessed through a mahogany paneled door, with an arched tympanum and keystone, that matches the exterior entry door. Shallow steps lead down from a landing just inside the room to the floor of wide oak boards. The walls are clad in dark green painted cypress paneling, offset by a white chair rail that flanks a simple fireplace surround, glass-fronted built-in bookshelves, and a cornice with heavy dentil molding. On the north side of the library, are ornate French doors, with a semicircular arch in the Palladian style, that access the terrace. Centered on the east wall of the foyer is an arched opening, with fluted pilasters and keystone, that accesses a short hallway that steps down to the double door entry of the dining room. The dining room features oak flooring and cypress paneling painted red. The modest dentil cornice, fireplace surround and chair rail are painted white, matching the treatment in the library. The dining room connects with the kitchen through a butler's pantry with glass-fronted cabinets, topped by smaller cabinets at the ceiling level that extend completely around the room. The countertops are made of Monel, and the narrow oak flooring continues into the large kitchen designed to facilitate grand-scale entertaining.

Accessed through an arched opening on the north wall of the foyer, located under the winding staircase, is the entry into the loggia, adjacent to the west of the kitchen in the rear wing, that leads to the game room at the north end of the rear wing. The enclosed loggia features a low groin-vaulted ceiling of brick and cement stucco, herringbone-laid brick flooring, and centered on a round-arched fireplace surround with a mirrored inset above the mantel. Opposite the fireplace are three double door arched openings to the terrace. The game room has exposed ceiling beams of rough-hewn cypress, cypress paneled walls and salvaged wide heart pine flooring that may have been saved from the prior plantation residence that was demolished so that this house could be built on the same site. The game room also gives access to a small wine cellar located in the basement. The private family quarters (not open for public tours) are found on the second floor and are accessed by a hallway featuring arches with fluted pilasters and keystones. The bedrooms have generally simpler finishes than those found on the ground floor, though the rear bedrooms and the third level finished space are quite plain. Giving access to each floor is an elevator that rises from the basement to the second level.

=== Grounds and other significant structures at the Site ===
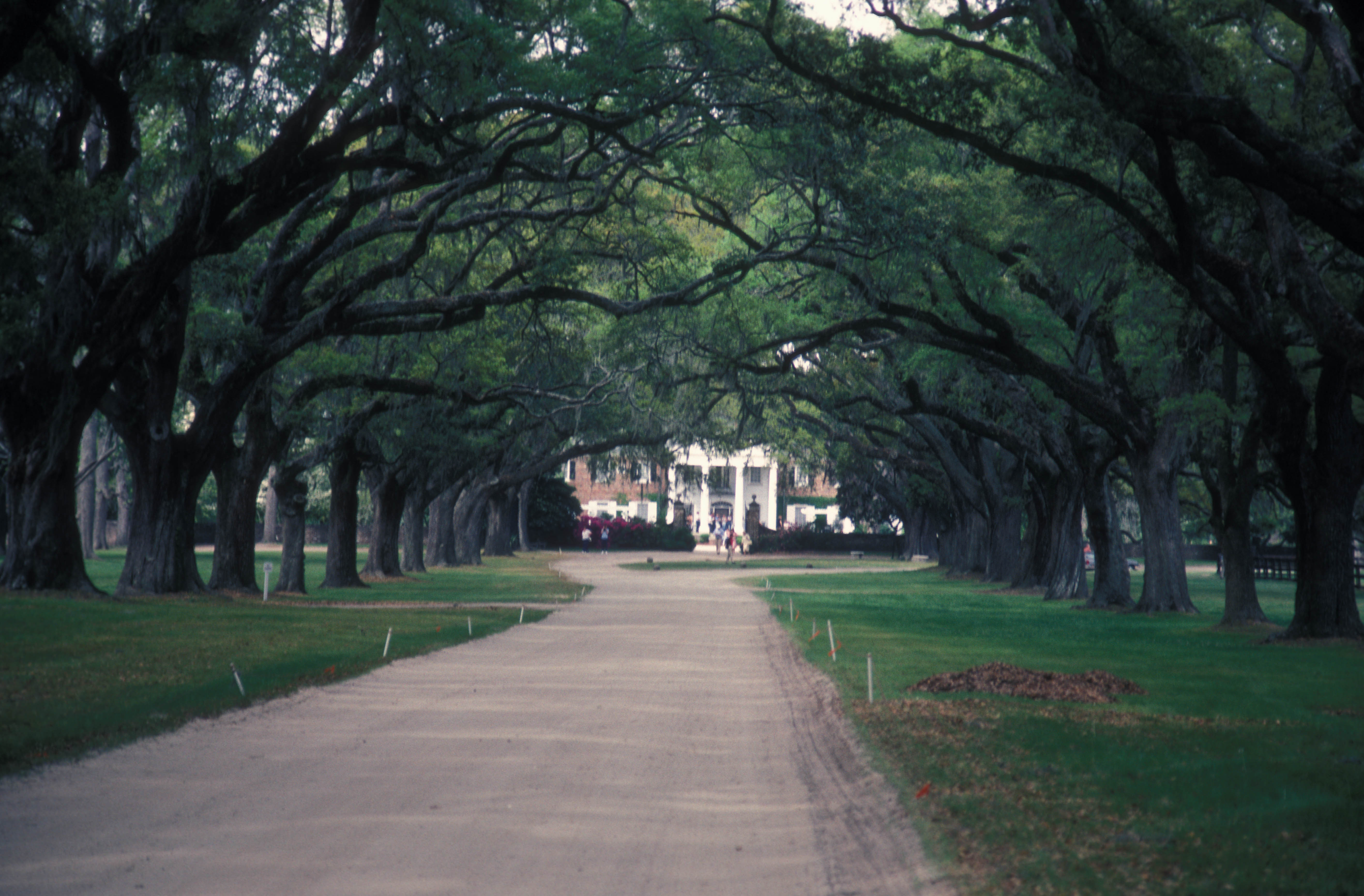
The Avenue of Oaks

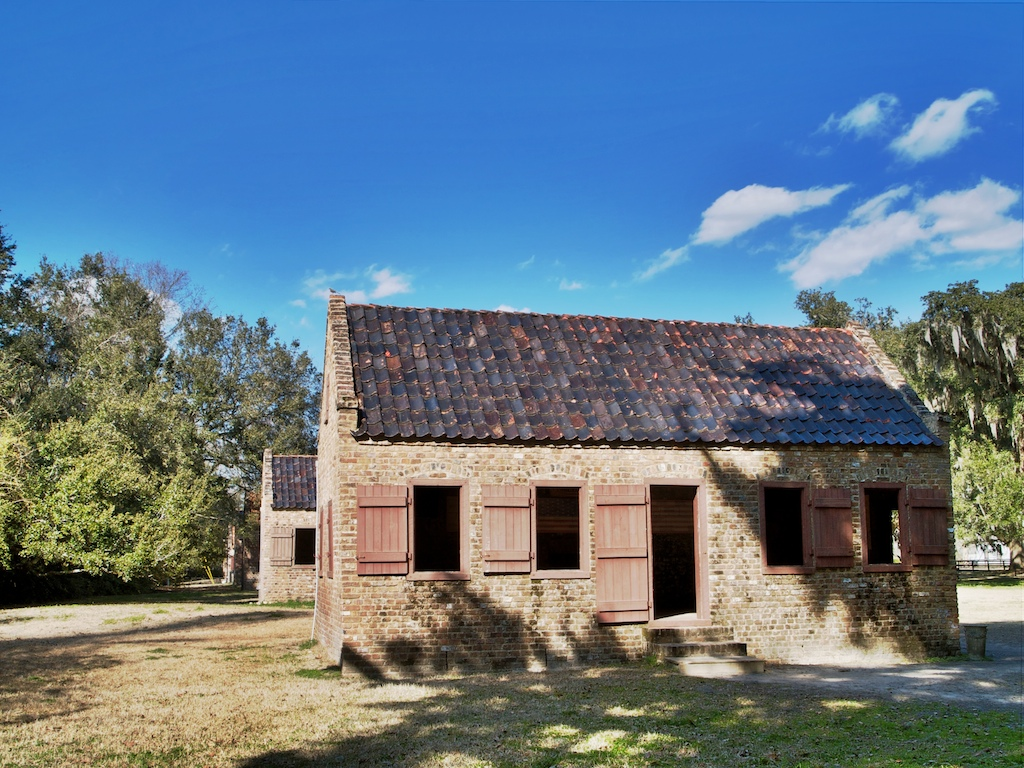
Boone Hall Slave Cabin

Boone Hall Plantation comprises 738 acres. The landscape includes areas of cultivated, seasonal crop fields, but also includes preserved wetlands, creeks, and ponds.

The most notable feature of the grounds is the grand Avenue of Oaks that was first planted in 1743 and completed by the Horlbeck brothers in 1843. On axis with the front facade of the house, the allée consists of 88 live oak trees and one magnolia, that are evenly spaced. It runs for 3/4 of a mile from the entrance of the plantation to a pair of brick gateposts. The gateposts are topped with ball finals, hung with formal wrought iron gates and, along with a brick serpentine wall, enclose the forecourt of the house. Open lawns at each side of the entry drive are flanked by formal gardens with brick-paved paths, laid among large live oaks and planted with camellias, azaleas and Noisette roses. Visitors arriving to the house in the 19th century by carriage would have driven through the tunnel of oaks, and past the many slave quarters to the left of the road. Their number and small massing would have starkly contrasted to the large, master's house at the end of the drive. Such a vista symbolizes the place as a place of work and production, rather than leisure.

The first slave cabins were likely made of wood. These brick slave cabins date from between 1790 and 1810. Built of brick, the one-story structures are 12 feet by 30 feet with gabled roofs, have either plank or dirt floors, and a simple fireplace with a brick hearth and no mantle at the rear of each house. The cabins were in use well into the 20th century, as they were occupied by sharecroppers through the 1940s. These dwellings were continuously occupied by enslaved workers, then free sharecroppers for nearly 150 years, making them incredibly significant to the history of the site.

On the wide forecourt directly in front of the house are two pergolas, constructed in 1993 as part of the ongoing efforts to enhance the gardens. At the southwest edge of the gardens, within the serpentine wall, is a brick smokehouse dating from 1750. The cylindrical structure has a conical timber roof sheathed in slate.

To the southeast of the main house is the large Cotton Gin house built in the 1850s. The machinery to process cotton is no longer found, and has since been used as a guest house, restaurant and gift shop by subsequent owners. This building has been renovated and reopened in September 2023 with a new visitor center, a museum that spans over three hundred years of history, a new gift shop, and historic event rental space upstairs.

== Boone Hall Plantation, Inc. ==
=== Boone Hall Farms ===
The agricultural operation of Boone Hall Plantation, incorporated filed with South Carolina Secretary of State to do business as Boone Hall Farms. During the spring and summer, BHF cultivates strawberries, and hosts an annual Low Country Strawberry Festival at the peak of each growing season, when guests pick thousands of pounds of strawberries from the U-Pick fields. The Boone Hall Farms farm-to-table program generates produce including tomatoes, squash, cucumbers, watermelons, sweet corn, and other produce for over 35 Lowcountry businesses and restaurants.

Boone Hall Farms now also offers its produce at Willie's Roadside Market, one of the premier outdoor farmers markets in the Lowcountry. Named after late Boone Hall owner Willie McRae, this market features a variety of fresh produce that is picked fresh daily in season from local Boone Hall Farms fields, and is often available for purchase on the same day.

=== Slave quarters ===
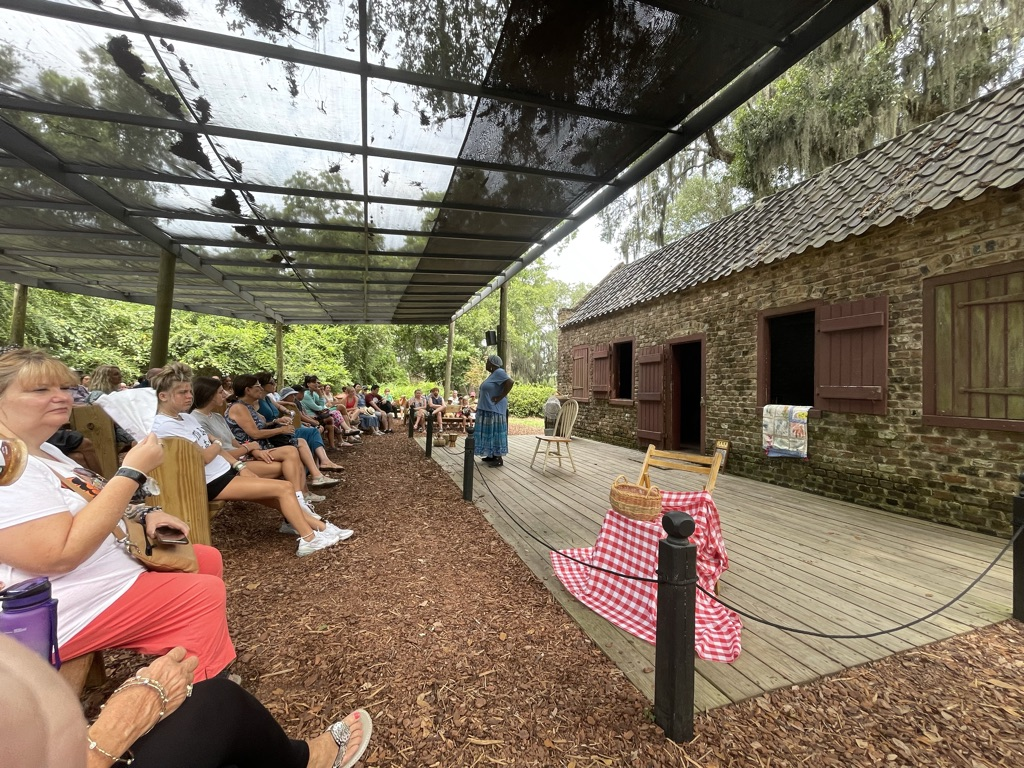
Gullah speaker presenter at Boone Hall Plantation.

The slave quarters that remain on the structure are the brick quarters that housed enslaved workers at the property. They have survived in large part because of the durability and quality of the materials they were constructed from. Many structures that house slaves were made from wood, and were easily removed from agricultural landscapes when the owner decided they no longer wanted a visual marker of the history of the enslaved on their property. The interpretation of the slave quarters at Boone Hall Plantation is more extensive than that of the main house, and includes many archaeological artifacts uncovered around these houses. The history of the enslaved workers at Boone Hall Plantation are also linked to Gullah culture, interpreted through living history presentations through song and storytelling. The history of the main house is disconnected entirely from the history of the slave quarters, however. While domestic enslaved workers would have cooked, cleaned, and performed many other tasks for the Boone, then Horlbeck families, slavery was illegal in 1935 when the historic house was built. Such limited interpretive exploration may be attributed to the site's lack of a curator, or curatorial staff to do more research and writing for the public's benefit.

=== 2020 plantation wedding controversy ===
Many former plantations open to the public allow venue rentals, most specifically for weddings. Boone Hall Plantation offers multiple buildings and locations on the property for these events. However, plantation weddings are controversial. In fact, wedding sites like the Knot stated they would cease promoting sites like Boone Plantation out of respect for the people who were enslaved at these places. Ryan Reynolds, who had a wedding at the venue in 2012, told a Fast Company reporter, "It’s impossible to reconcile. What we saw at the time was a wedding venue on Pinterest. What we saw after was a place built upon devastating tragedy. Years ago we got married again at home—but shame works in weird ways. A giant fucking mistake like that can either cause you to shut down or it can reframe things and move you into action. It doesn’t mean you won’t fuck up again. But re-patterning and challenging lifelong social conditioning is a job that doesn’t end.”

Representatives from Boone Hall Plantation issued a statement to Fox News saying, "We treasure all our relationships with couples that have chosen to get married at Boone Hall, and, when needed, respond to them in private, honest, and personal discussions to address any concerns they may have. The discussions are heartfelt as we want to listen and put love and respect at the center of any issues that arise. We will always work to be a part of the solution for our couples, not a part of the problem”.

== In popular culture ==
The grounds and buildings of Boone Hall Plantation have appeared in a number of major motion pictures and TV series:

- America (1972 TV Series)
- Days of Our Lives (1984)
- North and South (1985 & 1986 Mini-Series)
- Alex Haley's Queen (1993 Mini-Series)
- Scarlett (1994 Mini-Series)
- The Notebook (2004)
- The Price of Freedom (2004 Documentary)
- Bin Yah: There's No Place Like Home (2008)

== Gallery ==
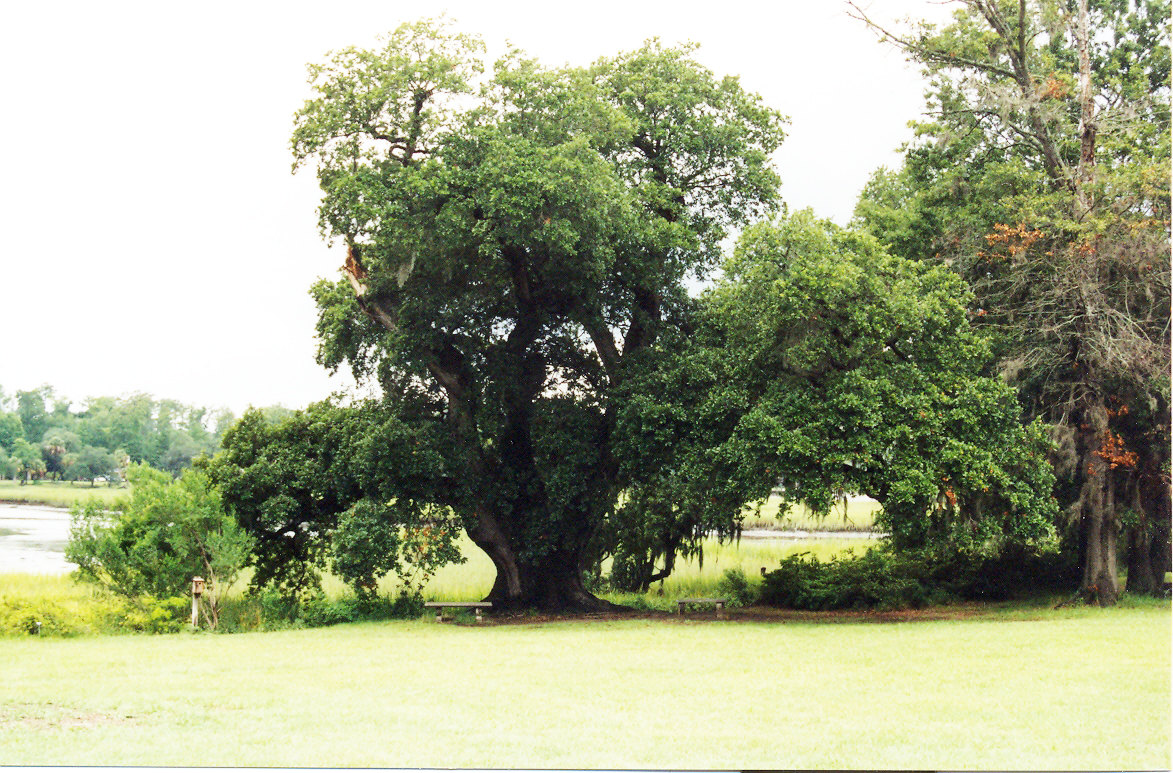
The oldest southern live oak at the plantation.

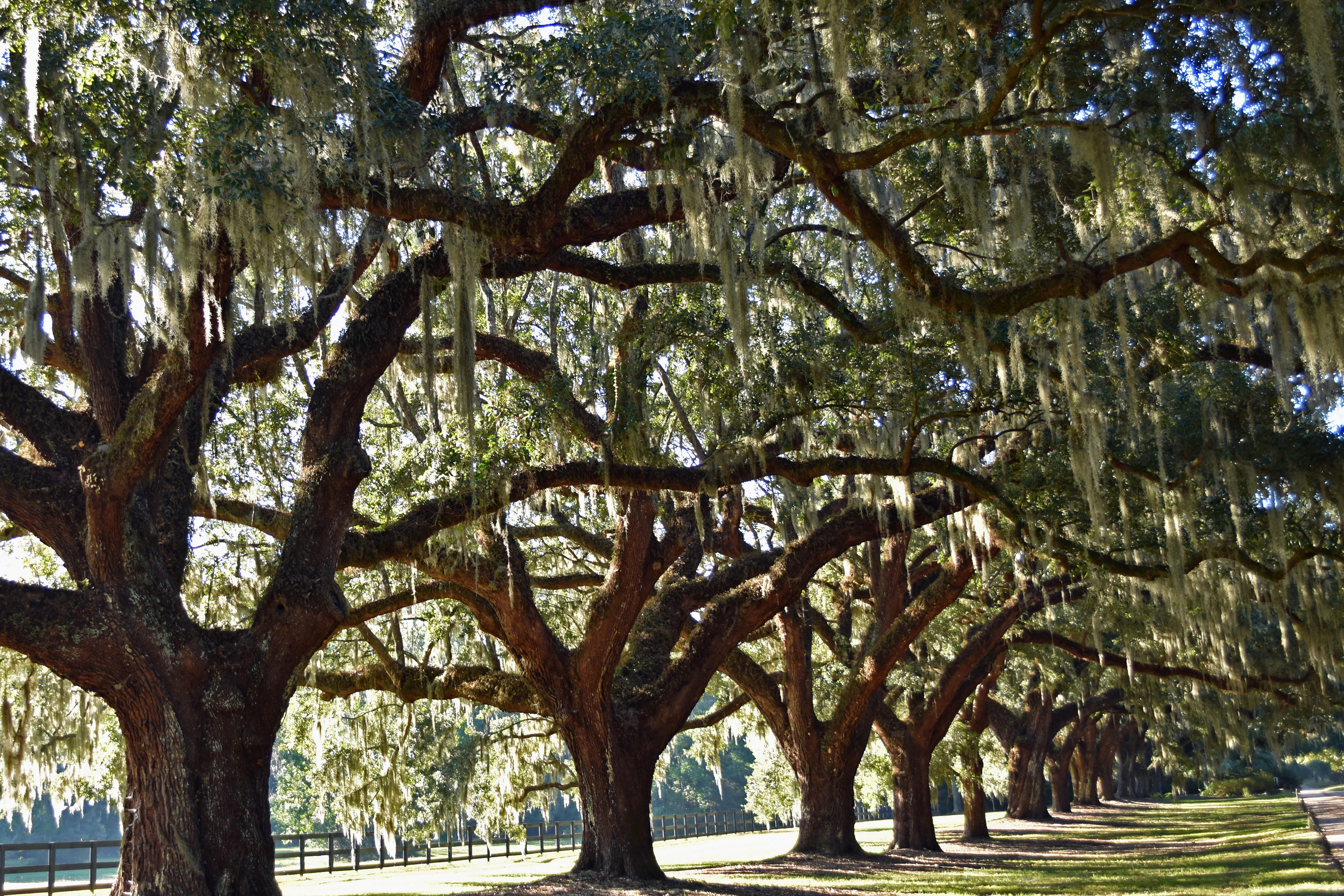
Avenue of oaks

== See also ==
- Antebellum South Carolina
- List of plantations in South Carolina
- National Register of Historic Places listings in Charleston County, South Carolina
