= Jorjadze =

Georgian noble family

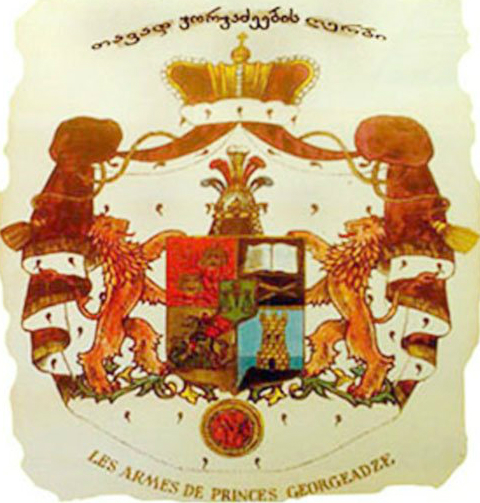
Coat of Arms of the Princes Jorjadze (1829)

The House of Jorjadze (Georgian: ჯორჯაძე) is an old Georgian noble family, which, in the 19th century, also became part of the Russian nobility.

== History ==
It is considered by a genealogical tradition to have been of Caucasian Albanian origin, settled in the southern Georgian province of Meskheti in 980 and removed to Kakheti in eastern Georgia in 1466. The family was elevated to a princely dignity by the kings of Kakheti and granted the office of mouravi (palatine) of Gremi, and of Eniseli, the latter being hereditary in the line.

Under Russian rule, the Jorjadzes were recognized as princes of the Russian Empire according to the decrees of 1829 and 1850.

Presently, there are 154 Jorjadze family members in Georgia.

There is one street named after Jorjadze in the capital of Georgia, Tbilisi.

== Notable members ==
- Barbare Jorjadze, Georgian poet, playwright, cookbook writer, and essayist
- Dimitri Jorjadze, Georgian prince and race car driver
- Nana Jorjadze, Georgian film director, scriptwriter and actress
- Tea Jorjadze, Georgian contemporary artist
- Zachary of Georgia (born as Zakaria Jorjadze), Catholicos-Patriarch of Georgia
