= Ilyinsky (surname) =

Ilyinsky is a surname. Notable people with the surname include:

- Alexander Ilyinsky (1859–1919), Russian music teacher and composer
- Igor Ilyinsky (1901–1987), Soviet and Russian actor, director, and comedian
- Paul Ilyinsky (1928–2004), three-time Mayor of Palm Beach, Florida
