= Barrington Moore Sr. =

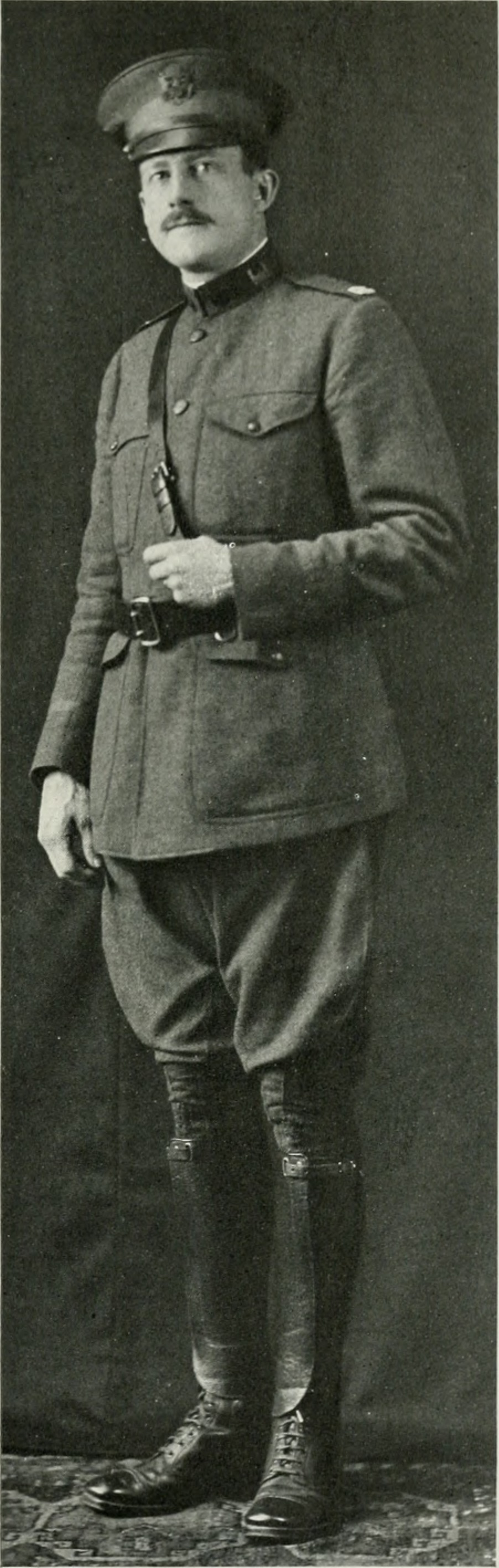
Moore during World War I

Barrington Moore Sr. (25 September 1883–1966) was an American forester and forestry researcher. He served as the fourth president of the Ecological Society of America and as the first editor-in-chief of its journal, Ecology. Moore chaired the Society of American Foresters' (SAF) Committee on Forest Policy, served as editor-in-chief of its Journal of Forestry, and represented the society on the National Research Council's biology division. Moore also served as secretary of the Council on National Parks, Forests, and Wildlife and as associate curator of woods and forestry at the American Museum of Natural History in New York City.

== Early life and education ==
Moore was born on September 25, 1883, the son of Clement Clarke Moore. He attended Craigie's School and Morristown School (now Morristown-Beard School) in Morristown, New Jersey before graduating from St. Mark's School in Southboro, Massachusetts in 1902. Moore then completed his bachelor's degree at Yale University in 1906 and his master's of forestry degree at Yale's School of Forestry in 1908.

While studying at Yale, Moore played on the football and track and field teams, and he joined, Alpha Delta Phi, a fraternity. During the summer following his junior year at Yale, Moore worked as a student assistant for the U.S. Forest Service in North Carolina. He later served on the Executive Committee of the Alumni Association of Yale's School of Forestry.

== Service during World War I ==
In 1919, the French government awarded Moore the Cross of the National Order of the Legion of Honour for his military service during World War I. He acquired lumber and other materials from France and several other countries to supply Allied Forces. Serving as captain of engineers, Moore helped organize a force of 18,000 troops to supply materials in advance of the arrival of Allied forces. Supplementing lumber and other wooden materials from France, he made acquisitions from Great Britain, Portugal, Switzerland, and the Scandinavian nations.

== Honors and legacy ==
Moore was a fellow of the New York Academy of Sciences. Since 1955, the Society of American Foresters has awarded the Barrington Moore Memorial Award to recognize biological researchers in the field of forestry.

== Family ==
Moore was a great-grandson of Clement Clarke Moore, author of the poem Twas the Night Before Christmas. He married Muriel Hennen on December 20, 1910. The couple had two children: sociologist Barrington Jr. and Peter Van Cortlandt Moore. Moore and Hennen separated in 1927.
