= Barrington Moore Jr. =

American sociologist (1913–2005)

- Born: May 12, 1913; Washington D.C., U.S.
- Died: October 16, 2005 (aged 92); Cambridge, Massachusetts, U.S.
- Occupation: Political sociologist

Academic background
- Education: Williams College; Yale University
- Doctoral advisor: Albert Galloway Keller

Academic work
- Doctoral students: Charles Tilly, Theda Skocpol, John Mollenkopf, Jon Wiener

Barrington Moore Jr. (12 May 1913 – 16 October 2005) was an American political sociologist, and the son of forester Barrington Moore.

He is well known for his Social Origins of Dictatorship and Democracy (1966), a comparative study of modernization in Britain, France, the United States, China, Japan, Russia, Germany, and India. The book puts forth a neo-Marxist argument that class structures and class alliances at particular points in time can account for the kinds of social revolutions that occurred and did not occur in those countries, putting some countries on a path to democracy, whereas others were put on a path to authoritarianism or communism. He famously argued, "no bourgeois, no democracy," which emphasized the important role played by a large middle-class in accomplishing democratization and ensuring democratic stability.

== Early life, education and career ==
Moore was born in Washington D.C. in 1913.

He studied Latin, Greek, and history at Williams College in Massachusetts. He also became interested in political science, and was elected to Phi Beta Kappa. He graduated in 1936. In 1941, Moore obtained his Ph.D. in sociology from Yale University where he studied with Albert Galloway Keller. He worked as a policy analyst at the U.S. Office of Strategic Services (OSS) and at the Department of Justice.

Moore's academic career began in 1945 at the University of Chicago. In 1948 he went to Harvard University, joining the Russian Research Center in 1951. He was emerited in 1979.

Moore's students at Harvard included comparative social scientists Theda Skocpol and Charles Tilly, urban sociologist John Mollenkopf, as well as historian Jon Wiener.

== Personal life ==
While working at the OSS, Moore met his future wife, Elizabeth Ito, and Herbert Marcuse, who became a lifelong friend. Elizabeth died in 1992. They had no children.

== Major works ==
Early in his academic career, Moore was a specialist on Russian politics and society, authoring his first book, Soviet Politics in 1950 and Terror and Progress, USSR in 1954. In 1958 his book of six essays on methodology and theory, Political Power and Social Theory, attacked the methodological outlook of 1950s social science.

=== Social Origins of Dictatorship and Democracy ===
Moore's groundbreaking work Social Origins of Dictatorship and Democracy (1966) was the cornerstone to what is now called comparative historical analysis in the social sciences.

Moore's concern was the transformation of pre-industrial agrarian social relations into "modern" ones. He highlighted what he called "three routes to the modern world"—the liberal democratic, the fascist, and the communist—each deriving from the timing of industrialization and the social structure at the time of transition.

Moore challenged modernization theory by stressing that there was not one path to the modern world and that economic development did not always bring about democracy.

He drew particular attention to the violence which preceded the development of democratic institutions. Initially, Moore set out to study a large number of countries, but reduced his number of cases to eight.

=== On tolerance ===
In 1965, Moore, Herbert Marcuse, and Robert Paul Wolff each authored an essay on the concept of tolerance and the three essays were collected in the book A Critique of Pure Tolerance. The title was a play on the title of Immanuel Kant's book Critique of Pure Reason. In the book Moore argues that academic research and society in general should adopt a strictly scientific and secular outlook and approach theories and conjectures with empirical verification.

== Works ==
- Barrington Moore, Jr. Soviet Politics – The Dilemma of Power: The Role of Ideas in Social Change, Harvard University Press, Cambridge, 1950.
- Barrington Moore, Jr. Terror and Progress, USSR: Some Sources of Change and Stability in the Soviet Dictatorship, Harvard University Press, Cambridge, 1954.
- Barrington Moore, Jr. Political Power and Social Theory: Six Studies, Harvard University Press, Cambridge, 1958. Expanded edition: Political Power and Social Theory: Seven Studies, Harper & Row, New York, 1965.
- Barrington Moore, Jr., Robert Paul Wolff, Herbert Marcuse: A Critique of Pure Tolerance, Beacon Press, Boston, 1965.
- Barrington Moore, Jr. Social Origins of Dictatorship and Democracy: Lord and Peasant in the Making of the Modern World, Beacon Press, Boston, 1966. ISBN 0-8070-5073-3.
- Barrington Moore, Jr. Reflections of the Causes of Human Misery and upon Certain Proposals to Eliminate Them, Beacon Press, Boston, 1972.
- Barrington Moore, Jr. Injustice: The Social Bases of Obedience and Revolt, M.E. Sharpe, White Plains, NY, 1978. ISBN 0-333-24783-3.
- Barrington Moore, Jr. Privacy: Studies in Social and Cultural History, M.E. Sharpe, Armonk, NY, 1983.
- Barrington Moore, Jr. Authority and Inequality under Capitalism and Socialism: USA, USSR, and China (Tanner Lectures on Human Values), Clarendon Press, Oxford, 1987.
- Barrington Moore, Jr. Moral Aspects of Economic Growth, and Other Essays (The Wilder House Series in Politics, History, and Culture), Cornell University Press, Ithaca, NY, 1998. ISBN 0-8014-3376-2
- Barrington Moore, Jr.Moral Purity and Persecution in History, Princeton University Press, Princeton, NJ, 2000. ISBN 0-691-04920-3.

== See also ==
- Critical juncture theory – Theory of large, discontinuous changes
- Democratization – Society becoming more democratic
- Historical sociology – Interdisciplinary field of research
- Stein Rokkan – Norwegian sociologist (1921–1979)
- Theda Skocpol – American sociologist and political scientist (born 1947)
- Charles Tilly – American sociologist (1929–2008)
