= Dimitri Jorjadze =

Georgian nobleman, hotel executive, race car driver (1898–1985)

Prince Dimitri Jorjadze
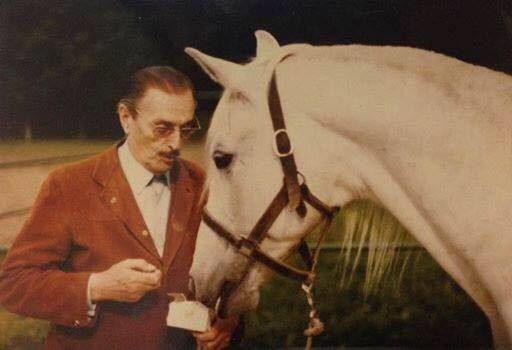
- Jorjadze in 1964
- Other names: Dimitri Djordjadze
- Born: 26 October 1898; Signagi, Georgia, Russian Empire
- Died: 26 October 1985 (aged 87); Monte Carlo, Monaco
- Noble family: Jorjadze
- Spouses: Audrey Emery (m. 1937, divorced); Sylvia Ashley (m. 1954; died 1977)
- Occupation: Ambassador Hotel executive, race car driver, race horse owner

Prince Dimitri Aleksandrovich Jorjadze (Georgian: დიმიტრი ჯორჯაძე) (26 October 1898 – 26 October 1985) was a Georgian nobleman, Ambassador Hotel executive, and race car driver.

== Biography ==
Dimitri (Mito) Jorjadze was born in the country of Georgia, Kakheti, to Alexander Jorjadze, a Georgian noble man, officer, diplomat and a winemaker, and his half Ukrainian-half Georgian wife - Domenica Naumenko. Dimitri was a member of the Georgian nobility of Tbilisi from the Jorjadze family, who became exiled after the overthrow of Tsarist Russia and the subsequent Bolshevik takeover.

The 6'3" prince was probably best known in racing circles. In early July 1931, he won the Touring Car Grand Prix, 24 Hours of Spa, in Belgium. He covered the greatest distance, 1,580.7 miles at a speed of 65.8 miles per hour, in a Mercedes-Benz SSK with Goffredo Zehender.

== Boone Hall ==
In June 1940, he bought the historic South Carolina plantation known as Boone Hall, eight miles from Charleston, South Carolina in the U.S., from Thomas A. Stone of Canada. He raced Thoroughbreds under the nom de course, Boone Hall Stable. Most notable of his horses was Princequillo, which in 1943, was the fastest distance runner in the United States and which became a two-time Leading sire in North America and a seven-time Leading broodmare sire in North America. The colors under Jorjadze were grey with 3 red roped clasp closings and a three looped soutache-like design around the buttons and a red cap.

Jorjadze was associated with Prince Serge Obolensky in the hotel business in New York City.

== Private life ==
He was married twice. His first wife was Audrey Emery, the American-born former wife of Grand Duke Dmitri Pavlovich of Russia; he married her in March 1937 in Maidstone, England. The marriage ended in divorce. He married for a second time in 1954 to Sylvia Ashley, a one-time English showgirl who had been married to Anthony Ashley-Cooper, Lord Ashley; Clark Gable; and Douglas Fairbanks, Sr.

== See also ==
- Jorjadze, Georgian surname
- Gael Elton Mayo, The Man in a Panther Skin: the Life of Prince Dimitri Djordjadze (1985);(Estate of Gael Elton Mayo c/o BookBlast, London) .
