= Audrey Emery =

- Princess Romanovskaya-Ilyinskaya; Princess Dimitri Djordjadze
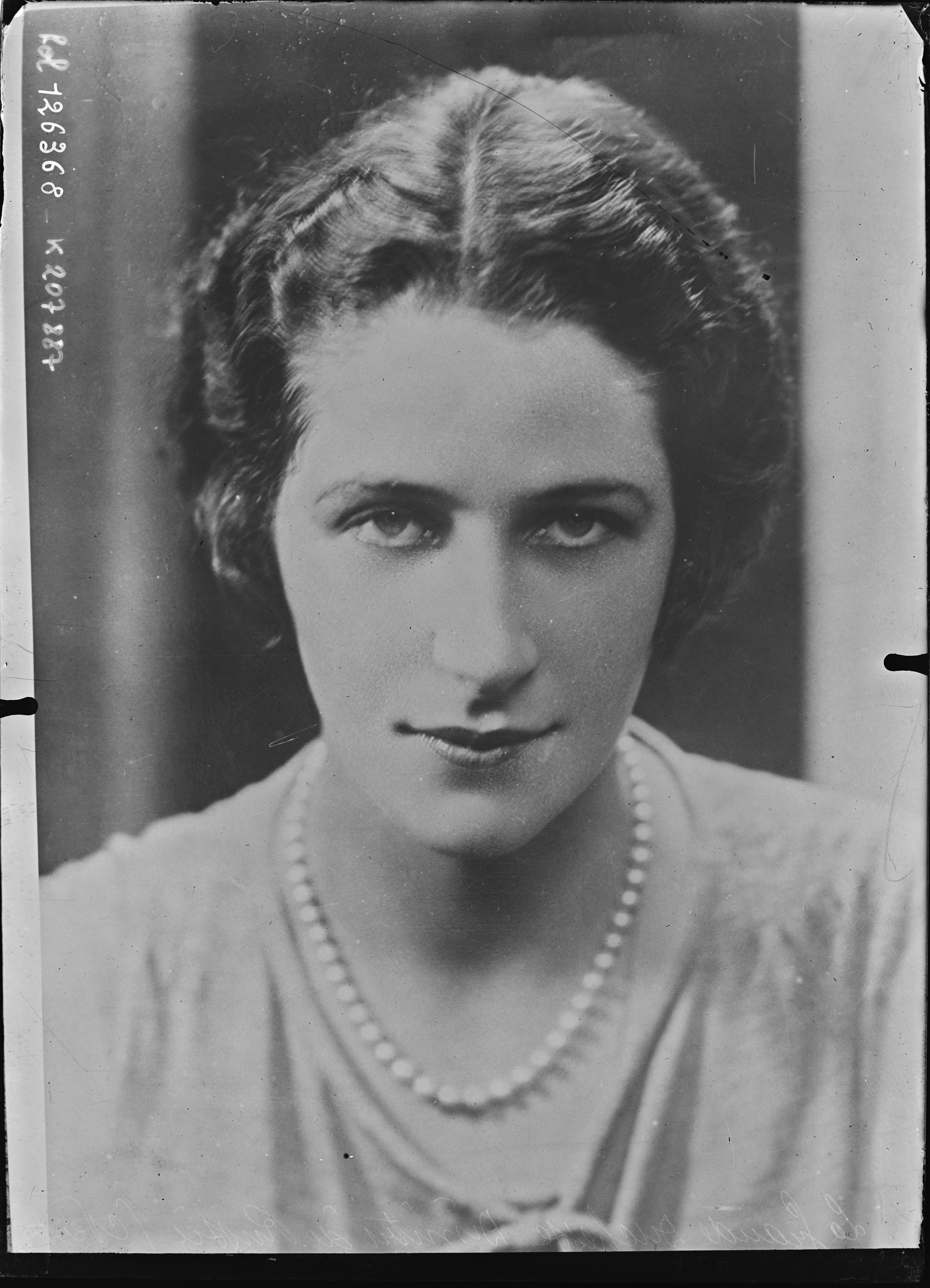
- Emery in 1928
- Born: Anna Audrey Emery; January 4, 1904; Cincinnati, Ohio, U.S.
- Died: November 25, 1971 (aged 67); West Palm Beach, Florida, U.S.
- Spouse: Grand Duke Dmitri Pavlovich of Russia (m. 1926; div. 1937) Prince Dimitri Djordjadze (m. 1937, divorced)
- Issue: Prince Paul Dmitriievich Romanovsky-Ilyinsky
- Father: John Josiah Emery
- Mother: Lela Amelia Alexander

Anna Audrey Emery (January 4, 1904 – November 25, 1971) was an American heiress and socialite who was the wife of one of the last Russian grand dukes.

== Early life ==
Audrey was born in Cincinnati, Ohio on 4 January 1904. She was the youngest daughter of John Josiah Emery (1835–1908), a real-estate millionaire, and his wife, the former Lela Amelia Alexander (1867–1953), daughter of General Charles T. Alexander, of Washington. She had two sisters, Alexandra (Mrs. Benjamin Moore, then Mrs. Robert Gordon McKay) and Lela (Mrs. Alastair Mackintosh, then Duchess of Talleyrand), and two brothers, Thomas Emery and John Josiah Emery Jr. (who married Irene Gibson Post, the daughter of the artist Charles Dana Gibson and niece of Lady Astor).

After her father's death, her mother remarried to the Hon. Alfred Anson, a British stockbroker living in New York City, in 1912. Anson was the seventh son of Thomas Anson, 2nd Earl of Lichfield and Lady Harriett Georgiana Louisa, daughter of James Hamilton, 1st Duke of Abercorn.

Her maternal grandparents were General Charles Tripler Alexander and Julia (née Barrett) Alexander of St. Paul, Minnesota and Bar Harbor, Maine.

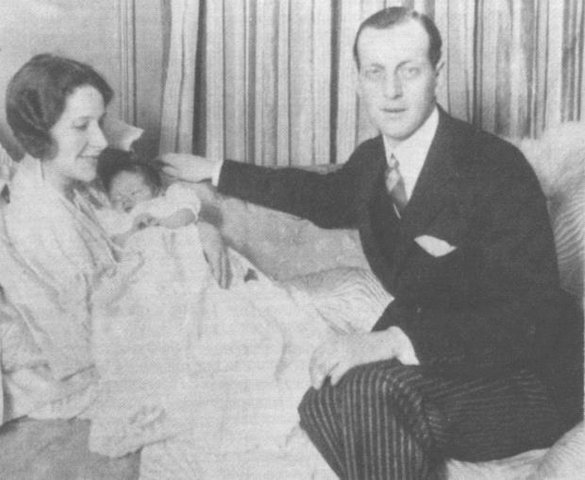
Emery with her husband Dimitri and their son Paul Ilyinsky in 1928

Following the death of her mother, she inherited a $40-million real estate fortune.

== Personal life ==
Her romantic attachments, including an involvement in summer 1926 with the popular novelist Michael Arlen, attracted press attention. In November 1926, she married, morganatically, Grand Duke Dmitri Pavlovich of Russia (1891–1942), an exile after the 1917 Russian Revolution, in Biarritz. The Grand Duke, a son of Grand Duke Paul and the late Princess Alexandra of Greece, was a grandson of both Tsar Alexander II of Russia and King George I of Greece. Dmitri's cousin, Grand Duke Cyril Vladimirovich of Russia, elevated Audrey to Russian rank of knyaginya (a noble, not dynastic "princess") with the usual name Romanovsky and granted her the suffix, Ilyinsky, from Dmitri's former property at Ilyinskoye in Krasnogorsky District, Moscow Oblast, Russia. Before their eventual divorce in 1937, she was the mother of one son:

Prince Paul Romanovsky-Ilyinsky (1928–2004), who became an American citizen, served in the U.S. Marine Corps, and was a three-time mayor of Palm Beach, Florida.

After her divorce, Audrey moved to France with her son, marrying that same year to Georgian Prince Dimitri Djordjadze (1898–1985). Audrey and Djordjadze also divorced. After the end of both marriages, she resumed her maiden name and was known as Mrs. Audrey Emery.

In the 1940s, she lived in South Carolina, later moving to Biarritz, France. Over the years, she owned several houses in Palm Beach (she was a member of the Everglades Club), Florida. In the 1960s, she built a house in Cincinnati, Ohio, to which she moved in order to be closer to her son and his family.

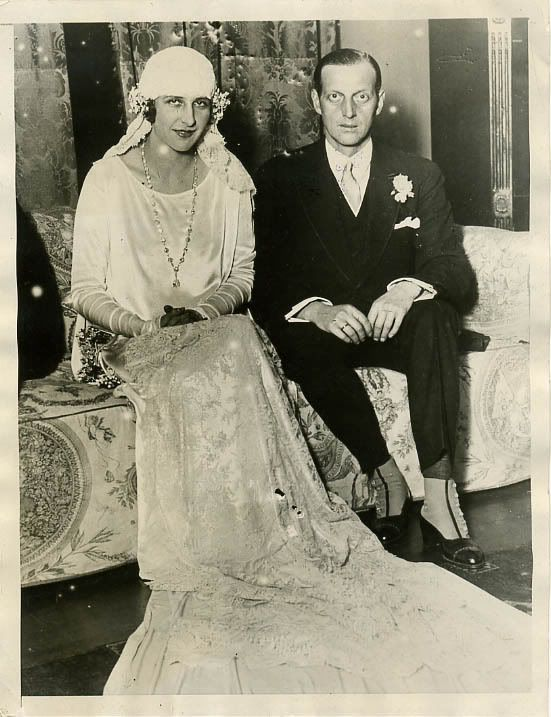
Emery at her wedding to her first husband Grand Duke Dmitri Pavlovich of Russia in1926

She died in Palm Beach on November 25, 1971.
