= John Mollenkopf =

John Hull Mollenkopf (born March 16, 1946) is an American political scientist, sociologist, and professor. He is recognized for his analyses of United States urban politics conducted in the latter part of the twentieth century, contributions to progressive debates and expert observations frequently sought out by the media.

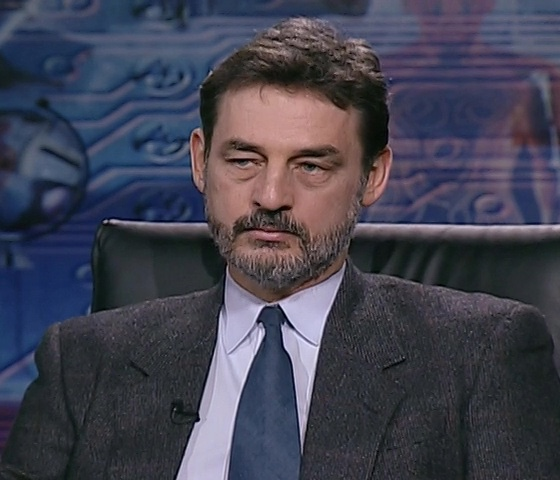
Mollenkopf on CUNY TV's Education Forum, 2001

Mollenkopf is a professor of political science and sociology, as well as director of the Center of Urban Research at the Graduate Center of the City University of New York. He has published both research and several books. He has also been a visiting scholar at Russell Sage Foundation. He attended Harvard University for his MA and PhD.
