= Grand Duke Dmitri Pavlovich of Russia =

Russian grand duke (1891–1942)

Grand Duke Dmitri Pavlovich
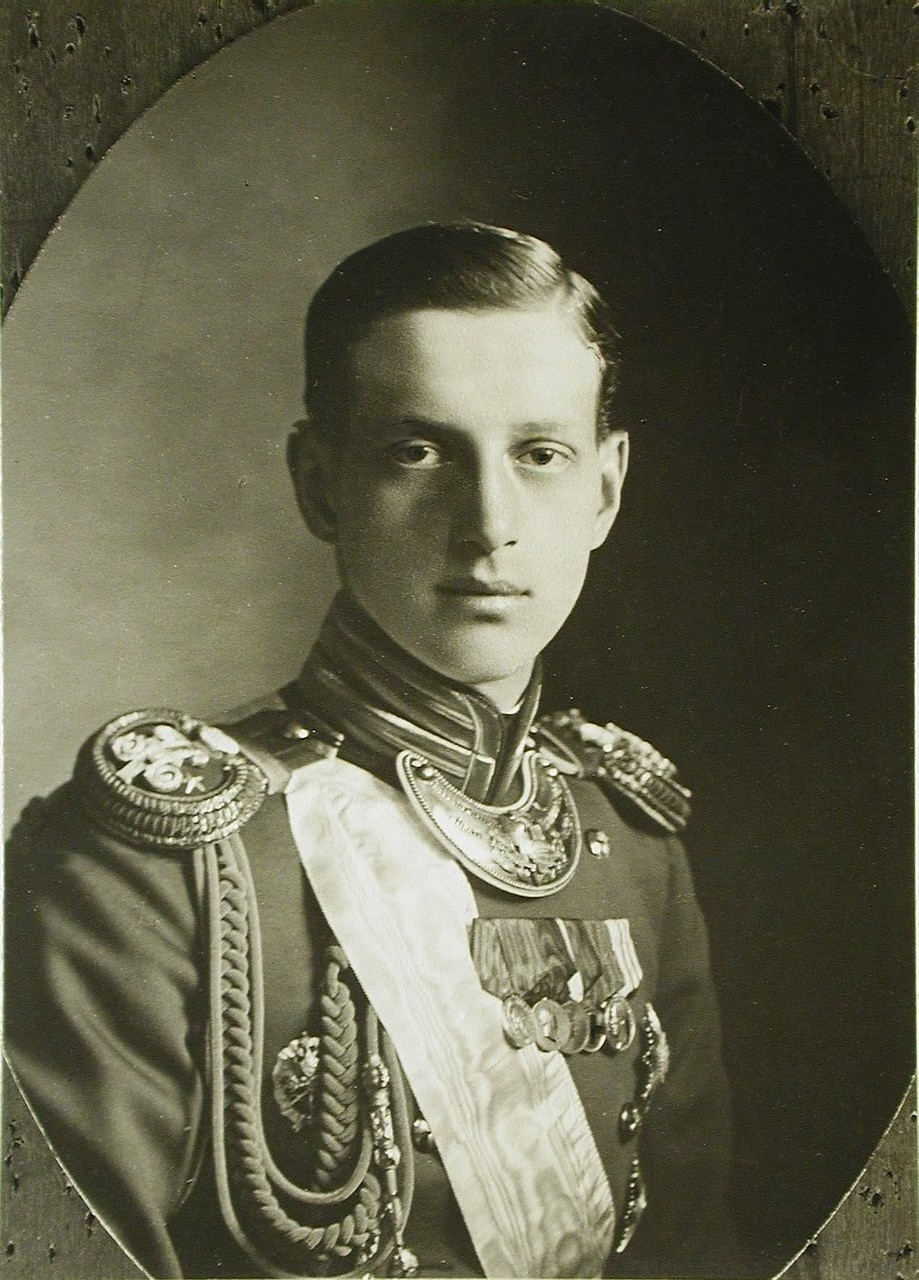
- Photograph, 1913
- Born: 18 September 1891; Ilyinskoye, Moscow Governorate, Russian Empire
- Died: 5 March 1942 (aged 50); Davos, Grisons, Switzerland
- Burial: Mainau, Lake Constance, Germany
- Spouse: Audrey Emery (m. 1926; div. 1937)
- Issue: Prince Paul Dimitriievich Romanovsky-Ilyinsky
Names
- Dmitri Pavlovich Romanov
- House: Holstein-Gottorp-Romanov
- Father: Grand Duke Paul Alexandrovich of Russia
- Mother: Princess Alexandra of Greece and Denmark

Grand Duke Dmitri Pavlovich of Russia (Russian: Великий Князь Дмитрий Павлович; 18 September 1891 – 5 March 1942) was a son of Grand Duke Paul Alexandrovich of Russia, a grandson of Tsar Alexander II of Russia and a first cousin of Tsar Nicholas II, Marie of Edinburgh (consort of Ferdinand I of Romania), King George II of Greece, King Alexander of Greece, Helen of Greece and Denmark, (second wife of Carol II of Romania), King Paul of Greece, and Prince Philip, Duke of Edinburgh (consort of Queen Elizabeth II).

His early life was marked by the death of his mother and his father's banishment from Russia after marrying a commoner in 1902. Grand Duke Dmitri and his elder sister Grand Duchess Maria Pavlovna, to whom he remained very close throughout his life, were raised in Moscow by their paternal uncle Grand Duke Sergei Alexandrovich and his wife Grand Duchess Elizabeth Feodorovna of Russia, an older sister of Empress Alexandra Feodorovna. His uncle was killed in 1905 and as his aunt entered religious life, Dmitri spent a great deal of his youth in the company of Tsar Nicholas II and his immediate family at the Alexander Palace as they viewed him almost like a foster son.

Grand Duke Dmitri followed a military career, graduating from the Nicholas Cavalry College. He was commissioned as a cornet in the Horse Guards Regiment. An excellent equestrian, he competed in the Olympic Games of 1912 in Stockholm. As a grandson of Tsar Alexander II in the male line, he occupied a prominent position as the Russian imperial court, but he had little interest in his military career, leading instead a fast life. Through his friendship with Felix Yusupov, he took part in the assassination of the mystic Grigori Rasputin, who was seen to have an undue and insidious influence on the Tsar and his wife.

Banished to the war front in Persia, he escaped the Russian Revolution and emigrated to Western Europe. He lived briefly in England, and during the 1920s in Paris, where he had a brief but notorious affair with the famous French fashion designer Coco Chanel. He also lived briefly in the United States. In 1926, he married Audrey Emery, an American heiress. The couple had a son before divorcing in 1937.

As the youngest Grand Duke to have survived the Russian Revolution, he was a prominent figure in the Russian community in exile, but he was not interested in politics, supporting instead the claim of his first cousin, Grand Duke Kirill Vladimirovich of Russia. By the outbreak of World War II, his health was already in decline, and he died of tuberculosis in Davos, Switzerland aged 50.

== Early life ==
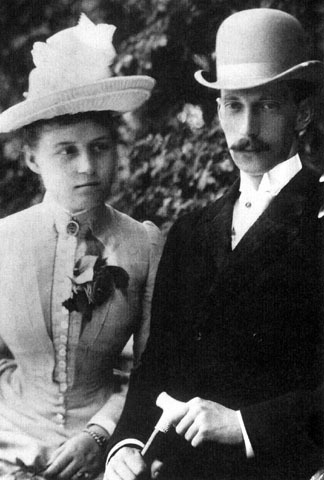
Dmitri's parents: Grand Duke Paul Alexandrovich and his first wife, Princess Alexandra of Greece and Denmark in 1889.

Grand Duke Dmitri was born on 18 September [O.S. 6 September] 1891 as the second child and only son of Grand Duke Paul Alexandrovich and his first wife, Grand Duchess Alexandra Georgievna of Russia, born Princess Alexandra of Greece and Denmark. Dmitri's father, Grand Duke Paul Alexandrovich, was the youngest child of Tsar Alexander II of Russia and his first wife, Empress Maria Alexandrovna. Dmitri's mother, Alexandra, was a daughter of George I of Greece and Olga Konstantinovna of Russia, and a sister of King Constantine I, and Andrew who was the father of Prince Philip, Duke of Edinburgh, making them first cousins. He was also first cousins to Marie, Queen of Romania and Grand Duchess Victoria Feodorovna of Russia, who were the daughters of his paternal aunt Grand Duchess Maria Alexandrovna of Russia who married Alfred, Duke of Saxe-Coburg and Gotha, the second son of Queen Victoria and Prince Albert of Saxe-Coburg and Gotha.

The birth took place under tragic circumstances. During the summer of 1891, Grand Duchess Alexandra and Grand Duke Paul visited Paul's brother Grand Duke Serge Alexandrovich at his country estate Ilyinskoye near Moscow. Alexandra was seven months pregnant with Dmitri when, while taking a stroll with some friends by the Moskva River, she jumped into a boat, falling as she got in. The next day, she collapsed in the middle of a ball from violent labor pains brought on by the previous day's activities; Dmitri was born in the hours following the accident. Alexandra slipped into a coma from which she never emerged. She died of eclampsia six days after Dmitri's birth. Although doctors had no hope for Dmitri's survival, he still lived, with the help of his uncle Grand Duke Sergei Alexandrovich of Russia, who gave the premature Dmitri the baths that were prescribed by the doctors, wrapped him in cotton wool and kept him in a cradle filled with hot water bottles to keep his temperature regulated, the treatment of the time to keep premature babies alive.

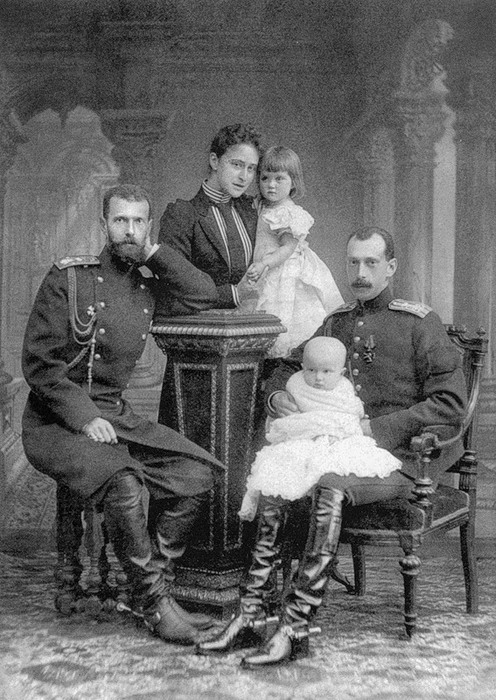
Grand Duke Sergei Alexandrovich, his wife Grand Duchess Elizabeth Feodorovna with Grand Duchess Maria Pavlova, and Grand Duke Paul with his son Dimitri on his lap

At birth, Dmitri had an older sister, Grand Duchess Maria Pavlovna, with whom he had a close relationship throughout his life. Grand Duke Paul was so distraught by the unexpected death of his young wife that he initially neglected Dmitri and Maria. The children were therefore largely cared for by Paul's elder brother, Grand Duke Sergei Alexandrovich, and his wife Grand Duchess Elizabeth Feodorovna, who had no children of their own. They spent Christmases and later some summer holidays with Grand Duke Sergei and Grand Duchess Elisabeth who set aside a playroom and bedrooms for the youngsters at their country home, Ilinskoe.

In his widowhood, Grand Duke Paul settled with his children in his palace in St Petersburg. The children occupied a nursery suite on the second floor, looked after by nurses and attendants. A commander of the imperial Horse Guards, Grand Duke Paul loved his children, but as was customary at the time, he refrained from showing them spontaneous affection. Dmitri and his sister were initially educated at home by governesses and private tutors, while they adored their father who visited them twice daily. Like all male members of the Romanov family, Grand Duke Dmitri was destined to follow a military career which traditionally began for a Grand Duke at the age of seven. This was delayed, in Dmitri's case, until he was nine years old. In the spring of 1901, his education was entrusted to General George Mikhailovich Laiming. Laiming was a warm, affectionate man who became devoted to his charge. He moved into the palace with his wife and their four-year-old son Boris. In their apartments, Dmitri and his sister enjoyed a warm family environment.

== Youth and education ==
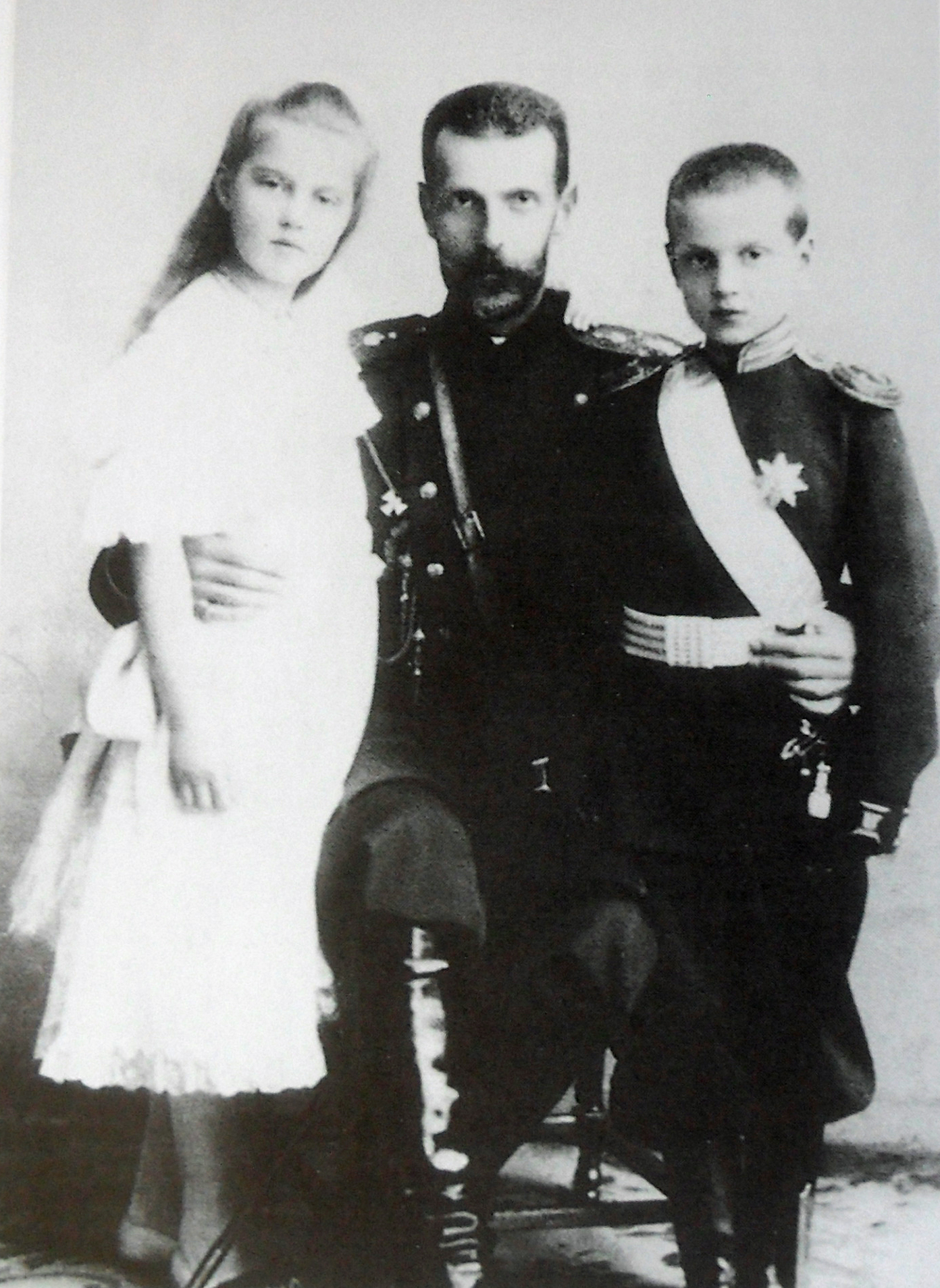
Grand Duke Dmitri and his sister Grand Duchess Maria Pavlovna Jr. with their uncle Grand Duke Sergei Alexandrovich of Russia, who was their guardian and foster father

In 1895, Grand Duke Paul began an affair with a married woman, Olga Valerianova Pistolkors. He was able to obtain a divorce for her and he eventually married Olga in 1902, while the couple was staying abroad. The marriage was a violation of the house law of the Romanovs, and as they had married defying Nicholas II's opposition, the Tsar forbade them to return to Russia and Grand Duke Paul was not allowed to take the children with him into exile. Left fatherless, eleven-year-old Dmitri and his twelve-year-old sister were sent to live with their uncle, Grand Duke Sergei, and his wife Grand Duchess Elizabeth Feodorovna (the Empress's sister), in Moscow.

The loss of their father and the sudden move to Moscow caused the children great distress. In her memoirs, Grand Duchess Maria Pavlovna (the Younger) describes Grand Duke Sergei as a stern disciplinarian, and his wife, Grand Duchess Elizabeth as a cold and unwelcoming presence. In 1903, at the age of twelve, Dmitri was enrolled in the Chevalier Guard regiment following studies at the Calvary Academy.

On 4 February 1905, Grand Duke Sergei, who had recently resigned from the post of Governor-General of Moscow, was assassinated by Ivan Kalyaev, a member of the Socialist-Revolutionary Party. Kalyaev, armed with a homemade bomb, had aborted his first attempt to kill the Grand Duke when he spotted Dmitri and Marie with their uncle in his carriage. The assassination of Grand Duke Sergei is the subject matter of the French writer and philosopher Albert Camus' 1949 play The Just Assassins. His uncle's death was only one of several assassinations that robbed Dmitri of close family members. (Note: His paternal grandfather, Alexander II, was murdered by revolutionary terrorists in 1881, and his maternal grandfather, George I of Greece, would be shot by an assassin in 1913. His father, Paul, and half-brother Vladimir ("Bodya") Paley would be murdered by the Bolsheviks in January 1919.) After Sergei's death, Dmitri's father, Grand Duke Paul was allowed to return to Russia to attend the funeral. He asked Nicholas II to restore the custody of his children but instead, Nicholas named Sergei's widow Grand Duchess Elizabeth Feodorovna as the children's guardian. Maria Pavlovna continued to have some feelings of anger toward her aunt, whom she would blame for her overly hasty and unsuccessful marriage to Prince Wilhelm of Sweden in 1908, but Dmitri formed a very strong bond with Elizabeth and came to admire her personal fortitude.

== Formative years ==
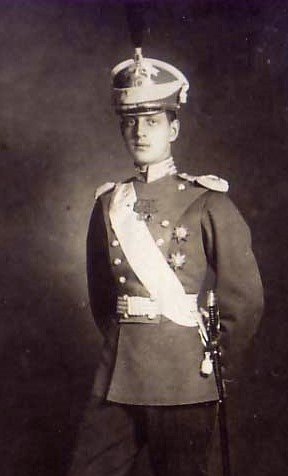
Grand Duke Dmitri c. 1910.

Maria Pavlovna's wedding to Prince William took place at Tsarskoe Selo in 1908, and she departed for Sweden with her husband. Elizabeth Feodorovna stayed on for a time at Alexander Palace in Tsarskoe Selo as guests of the Emperor and the Empress. It was during this period that Dmitri began to form a close bond with Nicholas II, looking upon him as a surrogate father. He joined him on his daily walks and sought to spend as much time with him as possible. Nicholas, in turn, treated Dmitri very kindly. He seems to have loved the young man's free spirit and sense of humor, a welcome diversion from the stresses of his daily life.

In 1909, Dmitri left his aunt's care to move to St Petersburg with his head tutor and companion, General Laiming. He lived at his father's vacant palace and then at the Beloselsky-Belozersky Palace, which he had inherited from his uncle Grand Duke Sergei, and would become his principal residence until he left Russia. He enrolled in the Nikolaevskoe Cavalry School, and upon graduation, he was commissioned as a cornet in the Horse Guards Regiment, which his father had once commanded.

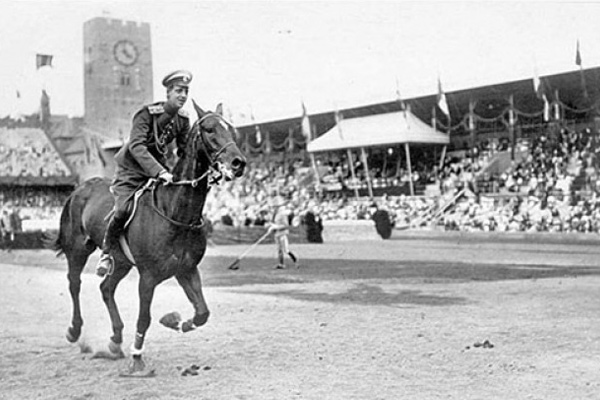
Grand Duke Dmitri at the 1912 Stockholm Olympics.

As a cousin of Tsar Nicholas II in the male line, he occupied a prominent position as the Russian imperial court, and led a fast life in the Russian upper class. He was an excellent equestrian, and he competed in show jumping at the 1912 Stockholm Olympics. He placed ninth in the individual jumping event whereas Russia placed fifth in the team jumping event. Disappointed in the performance of the Russian team, Dmitri started the idea of a national Russian sports competition, the very beginning of what under Soviet rule became the Spartakiad.

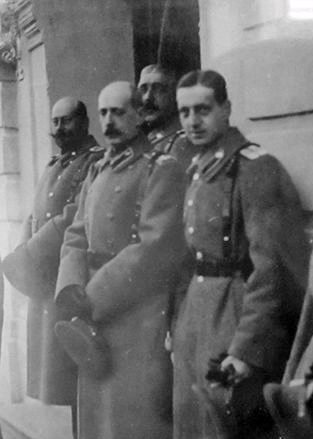
Grand Duke Dimitri (on the right) next to his father Grand Duke Paul Alexandrovich during the war

In Spring 1914, Dmitri's father returned to live in Russia, settling with his second wife and new family at Tsarskoye Selo. Around the same time, Dmitri's sister, Grand Duchess Maria Pavlovna, who had divorced her husband, also returned to Russia moving with Dmitri. However, troubled by her strong need for him, Dmitri distanced himself somewhat from his sister, hurting her terribly. A few months later, World War I began. All members of the family joined the war effort. Dmitri served with the Life Guard Horse Regiment, participating in the campaign in East Prussia. During the first weeks of the war he was awarded the Order of St. George after he rescued a wounded corporal under heavy gunfire.

In 1914, his friend Felix Yusupov married the Tsar's only niece, Princess Irina. After this, according to Meriel Buchanan, he became "more recklessly dissipated", helpless and desolate. Historian Greg King claimed that Dmitri "harboured an intensely romantic devotion" to the openly bisexual Felix. Felix himself claimed that it was because Dimitri had wanted to marry Irina himself.

== Killing of Rasputin ==
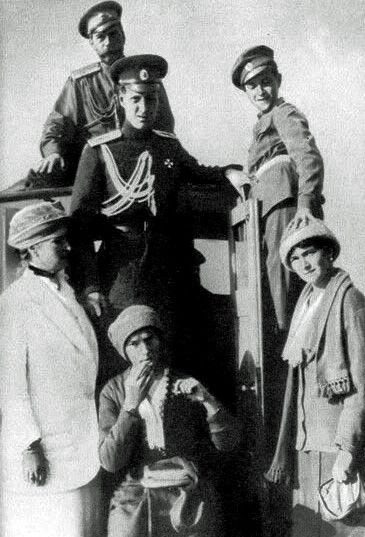
Grand Duke Dimitri and the imperial family in a private boat trip in the Dnieper, near the Russian imperial army HQ during the First world war in Mogilev. Clockwise: Tsar Nicholas II, Tsesarevich Alexei, Grand Duchess Olga, Grand Duchess Tatiana, Empress Alexandra, and Grand Duke Dmitri.

In August 1915 when Nicholas II left St. Petersburg to take full command of the Russian armies fighting World War I, his wife Empress Alexandra Feodorovna took on the daily administrative affairs of the government from the capital. Alexandra relied on Grigori Rasputin, a peasant healer who appeared to have brought her hemophiliac son Alexei, the Tsarevich, back from the brink of death. As Russian defeats mounted during the war, both Rasputin and Alexandra became increasingly unpopular. Eventually, Grand Duke Dmitri Pavlovich joined Felix Yusupov, Vladimir Purishkevich (the leader of the monarchists in the Duma) Dr. Stanislaus de Lazovert and Lieutenant Sergei Mikhailovich Sukhotin, an officer in the Preobrazhensky Regiment, in a conspiracy to kill Grigory Rasputin hoping that ending his influence over the imperial family this would have a beneficial effect on the Tsar's policies.

On Friday night 16/17 December (OS), Yusupov, who had visited Rasputin regularly in the past few months for treatment, invited Rasputin to his home. With Stanislaus de Lazovert dressed in a chauffeur uniform, Felix went to Rasputin's home to pick him up. Around 1:30 am, they arrived at Yusupov's Moika Palace where a room in the basement in the east wing had been specially prepared for the killing. For about an hour, Felix entertained the unsuspecting Rasputin with red wine until he got him drunk. Then, while both were sitting, Yusupov shot Rasputin at close range using Dmitri's Browning pistol. The bullet entered Rasputin's body from the left side perforating the stomach, liver, and kidney. The wound was lethal, but Rasputin did not die right away, bleeding profusely instead. In shock, Yusupov let Rasputin alone to die. He joined his fellow conspirators: Grand Duke Dmitri, politician Vladimir Purishkevich, and army officer Sergei Mikhailovich Sukhotin who were waiting in a ground floor study/drawing-room. Meanwhile, Rasputin, still alive, tried to flee through a side door into a gated courtyard that opened onto the street outside. Alarmed he might escape, Purishkevich then shot Rasputin in the back, on the doorstep. The bullet lodged into the vertebral column. The body was taken inside and Rasputin was shot in the forehead at point-blank range. In a rage, Yusopov kicked Rasputin's corpse with the tip of his military boots, smashing his nose and right eye and disfiguring his face. Then the assassins drove to Varshavsky Rail Terminal where they burned Rasputin's clothes and returned to Yusupov's home. At 4.50 a.m. Dmitri drove the men and Rasputin's body, wrapped in a broadcloth, to Petrovskii Bridge, which crossed to Krestovsky Island. About 5 a.m, they threw the body into the Malaya Neva into a hole they made in the ice. All along, Grand Duke Dmitri, who was driving the car, never saw Rasputin.

News of Rasputin's murder spread quickly. That Saturday, an evening newspaper already published details of the assassination correctly identifying the place and some of the details. By Sunday, Dmitri was placed under house arrest. Felix Yusupov, who had tried to flee to Crimea was stopped at the train station. He was then living at his mother-in-law's palace, but on the advice of his uncle by marriage Grand Duke Nicholas Michailovich, he moved to Dmitri's palace for protection as it was the prerogative of the Tsar alone to prosecute members of the Imperial family.

Rasputin's body was found on 19 December by a river policeman who was walking on the ice and discovered the frozen body. The post-mortem was held the following day. Major-General Popel carried out the investigation of the murder. By this time Dr. Stanislaus de Lazovert and Lieutenant Sergei Mikhailovich Sukhotin had fled from the city. He did interview Grand Duke Dmitri, Felix Yusupov, and Vladimir Purishkevich, but he decided not to charge them with murder.

== Exile ==
=== Banishment to Persia ===
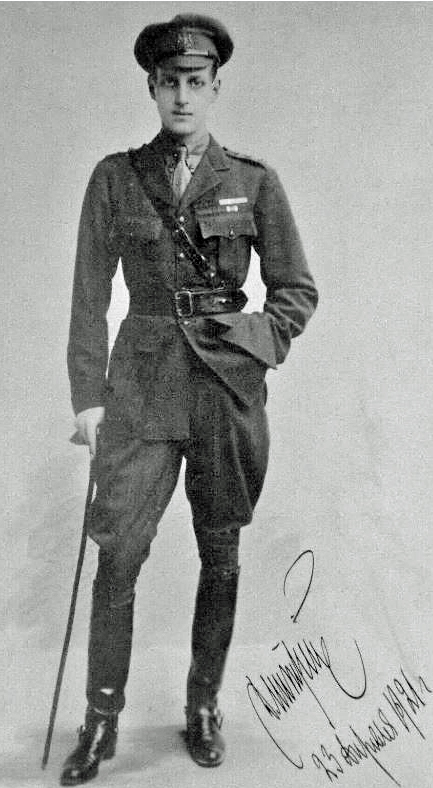
Grand Duke Dimitri Pavlovich in exile, 1921

As a result of his participation in Rasputin's assassination, Grand Duke Dmitri Pavlovich was banished from the Russian court and was sent to exile to the Persian war front. Pleas for clemency from Romanov relatives on his behalf were dismissed by the Tsar. In the early hours of 6 January 1917 [O.S. 24 December 1916], Grand Duke Dmitri left Saint Petersburg never to return. After four days of travel, he reached Baku on the Caspian Sea, sailing the next morning to the southern, Persian shore.

At his arrival in Persia, he was welcomed by his officers as his reputation for the Rasputin assassination had made him popular. He served ten weeks under General Nikolai Baratov who headed the 1st Caucasus Cossack Corps on the Caucasus Front in the Persian city of Qazvin. Within two months Nicholas II was forced to abdicate ending the rule of the Romanov dynasty. General Baratov asked Dmitri to leave since there were rumblings from the lower ranks, and his safety could not be guaranteed. Ronald Wingate entertained Pavlovich when he passed through Najaf. The Provisional Government invited him to return to Russia, but he declined. Lacking both friends and money, he lived precariously. In the summer of 1917, Dmitri left the Russian occupation zone moving to Tehran. Dmitri stayed briefly with General Meidel (ru), then the head of the Persian Cossack Division, before being taken in by the British Minister to Tehran, Sir Charles Murray Marling, and his wife, Lucia. Through 1917 and most of 1918 Grand Duke Dmitri lived with the Marlings.

Marling obtained an honorary commission for Pavlovich as a liaison officer with the British Mission and eventually persuaded the British Foreign Office in 1918 that he would become the next Emperor of Russia, gaining his admission to England. Marling became an important father figure to Pavlovich, and the relationship there established between them would prove to be close and enduring.

=== Interlude in England ===
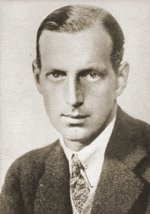
Dmitri in exile in the 1920s

Marling and his family took Dmitri with them when they left Tehran for England at the end of 1918. During the long journey to England in a slow steamer, Pavlovich fell ill with typhoid fever in Bombay and nearly died. He had to recuperate in Cairo. In January 1919 he arrived in France via Egypt. He crossed the Mediterranean, disembarked in Marseilles, continuing by land to Paris. He had kept an apartment at the Hotel Georges V, and in France, he learned of the tragic end of many of his Romanovs relatives. (Note: The Russian Revolutionaries killed most of Pavlovich's family. Prince Vladimir Paley, Dmitri's half-brother was arrested in St. Petersburg on 26 March 1918, along with three sons of Grand Duke Konstantin Konstantinovich, a grandson of Nicholas I: Prince Ioann, Prince Konstantin, and Prince Igor. On 18 July 1918, the day after the execution of Tsar Nicholas II and his family, Dmitri's half-brother Prince Vladimir Paley, Prince Ioann, Prince Konstantin, Prince Igor, Grand Duke Sergei Mikhailovich and Grand Duchess Elizabeth Feodorovna, Dmitri's aunt and his former guardian, were murdered by the Bolsheviks.) The Marlings took him to London where he was reunited with his maternal aunt Grand Duchess Maria Georgievna. She provided him with the money from the proceeds from the sale of his St Petersburg palace, which had gone through before the Bolsheviks seized power. Pavlovich took a room at the Ritz and spent most of his time with his aunt.

Lady Marling went to see the King's assistant private secretary Lord Cromer to inform him of the grand duke's arrival. King George V was horrified; his presence was an inconvenience to the British government that did not want to upset the new Bolshevik regime.

In London, Dmitri was finally reunited with his sister Grand Duchess Maria Pavlovna who had escaped Revolutionary Russia though Ukraine with her second husband, Prince Sergei Mikhailovich Putiatin. Dmitri moved with his sister and brother-in-law taking a house together in South Kensington. The Yusupovs had escaped Russia with the Dowager Empress, Maria Feodorovna, and they too settled in London. Pavlovich avoided Yusupov, resenting his breaking the silence regarding the details of Rasputin's assassination. Relations between Dmitri and Putiatin also soon soured. In spring 1920, Maria Pavlovna returned to Paris to meet with their stepmother, Princess Olga Paley, and their two half-sisters. She decided to stay in the French capital in order to be close to them. Unhappy in England, Dmitri followed his sister to Paris in the summer of 1920.

=== Exile in Paris ===
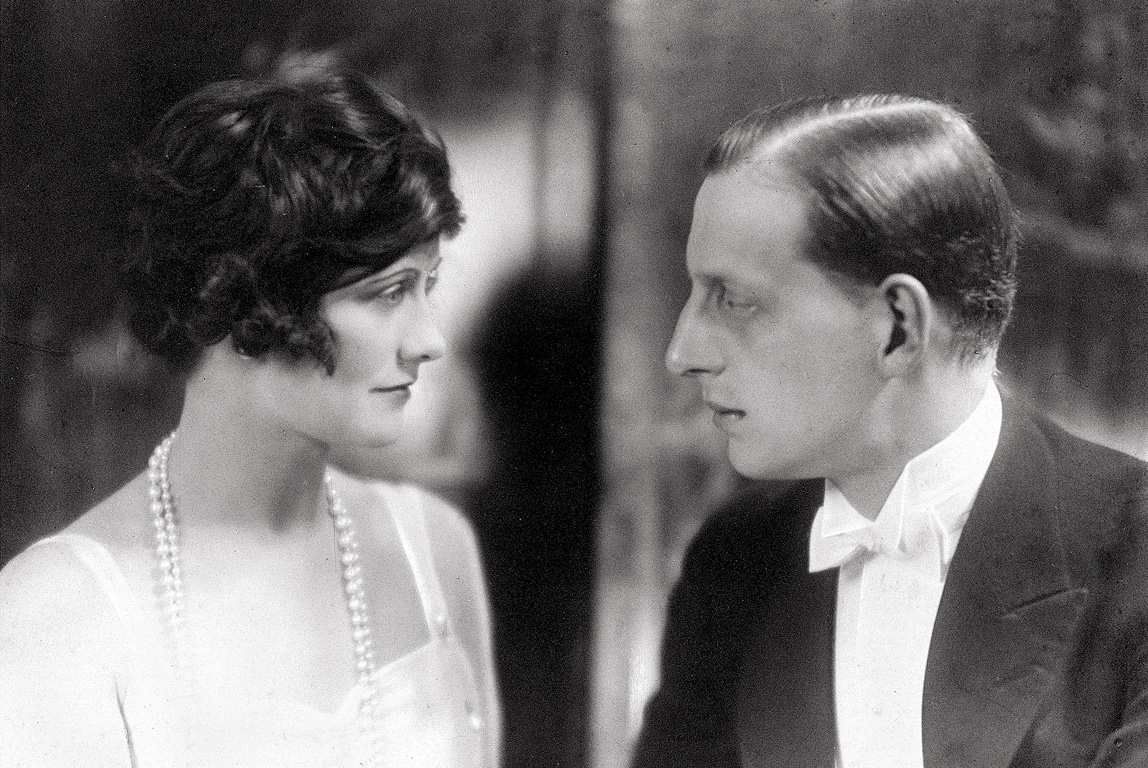
Grand Duke Dmitri and Coco Chanel in the 1920s

In Paris, Dmitri took rooms at a hotel until he found a modest two-room apartment. The proceeds from the sale of his St Peterburg palace enabled him to live well but they depleted quickly. He had given generously to other emigres in need and to Russian charities. In the summer of 1921, Dmitri accompanied his sister to Denmark to a reunion with her son Prince Lennart. While in Denmark, Dmitri saw the Marling family again and with his sister visited Maria Feodorovna, who had retired to her villa Hvidore.

With his economic resources depleting, Grand Duke Dmitri found employment serving on the board of a Champagne firm. An American journalist described him around this time as attractive: "He is, in his slender well-groomed person, all that a grand duke should be – especially if you like your grand duke young, clean-shaven, and concave at the waistline. He has a figure like Rudolph Valentino". Well known in the Paris scene of the 1920s, Dmitri was then having an affair with opera singer Marthe Davelli. It was through her that Dmitri became close to Gabrielle "Coco" Chanel. "You take him", the singer allegedly offered him to her old friend: "He is too expensive for me". Chanel and Dmitri, who had actually met before in pre-World War I Paris, became lovers. Their relationship lasted around a year. It began in spring 1921 with an off-season stay in Monte Carlo where they tried to live as discreetly as possible. Dmitri's sister, Maria Pavlovna, found a niche for herself in the rising Paris fashion industry by founding a business called "Kitmir" that specialized in bead and sequin embroidery and did much work for Chanel. It was Dmitri who introduced Chanel to Ernest Beaux, the perfumer who created Chanel No. 5, her most enduring product. Coco and Dmitri spent a happy summer at a villa near Arcachon. Their romance fizzled out, but they remained friends. Chanel would later comment: "These grand dukes, they are all the same, an admirable face behind which there is nothing, green eyes, broad shoulders, fine hands... the most peaceful people, shyness itself. They drink just not to be afraid. Tall, handsome, superb these Russians are. And behind that is nothing: hollowness and vodka."

As the youngest Grand Duke to have survived the Russian Revolution, Pavlovich was a prominent figure of the Russian community in exile. He had been proposed as a potential candidate for the throne by several monarchist groups. During the early 1920s, there was a bitter rivalry between the camps of the supporters of Grand Duke Kirill Vladimirovich and those of Grand Duke Nicholas Nikolaevich. While those who supported neither Nicholas nor Kirill advocated for Dmitri's candidacy for the Russian throne.

On 8 August 1922, a makeshift Zemsky Sobor was convened at Priamurye, and Grand Duke Nicholas Nikolaevich was "elected" Emperor. The Grand Duke neither accepted nor refused this empty gesture. Having waited for confirmation of the death of Tsar Nicholas II, his son, and his brother, in 1924 Grand Duke Kirill Vladimirovich announced (also on 8 August) that he would assume "guardianship" of the throne of Russia. Shortly thereafter, on 13 September, he issued his manifesto on the assumption of all imperial rights and the title of Emperor. On 25 September 1924, Grand Duke Alexander Michailovich issued an appeal to Russians to stand with Grand Duke Kirill Vladimirovich. It was at this time that Grand Duke Dmitri Pavlovich, who had no political ambitions for himself, supported instead the claim of his first cousin, Grand Duke Kirill Vladimirovich. Grand Duke Dmitri was also active politically. Together with his cousin, Prince Dmitri Alexandrovich, he was very involved in the monarchist youth organizations which sprang up in the years between the wars. By 1923, the largest of these was the "Union of Young Russia" which preached orthodoxy, nationalism, monarchism and peasant collectivism.

=== Marriage ===
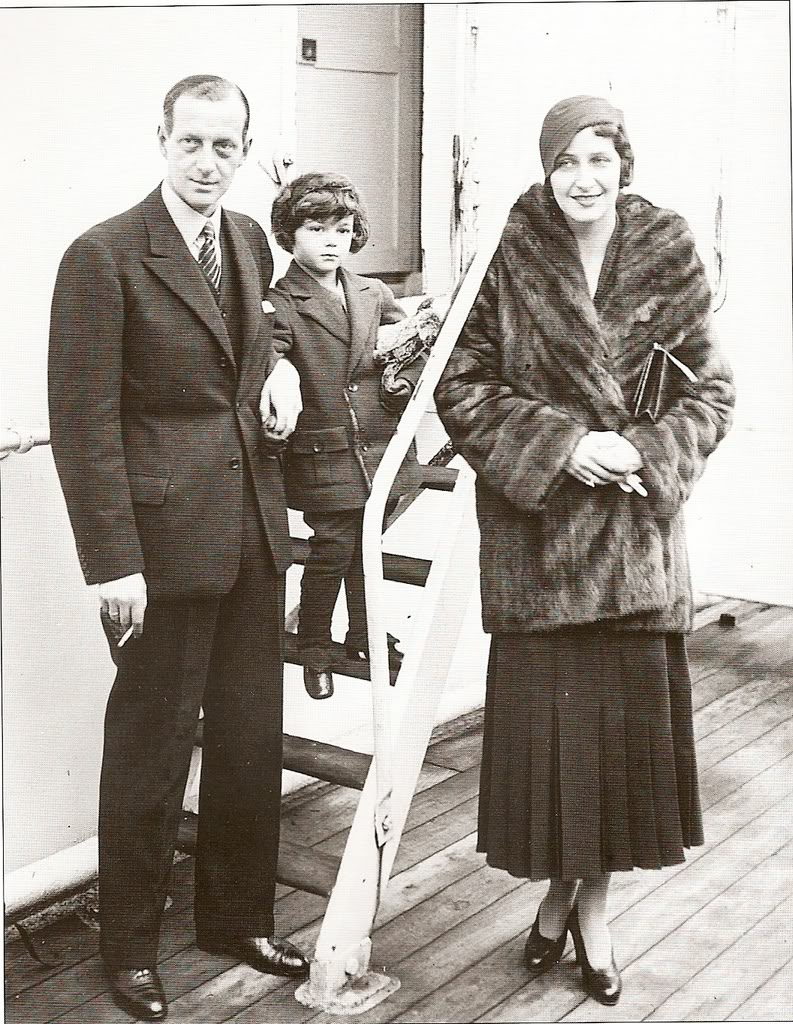
Grand Duke Dmitri Pavlovich of Russia with his wife Audrey Emery and their son in the 1930s

In 1923 Grand Duchess Maria Pavlovna divorced her second husband and bought a small house at Boulogne-sur-Seine and Dmitri moved with her to the top floor. As he worked at Reims for the champagne company, he was out most of the day but spent the evening with his sister. Invited to a tea party at Versailles with his sister, he met Audrey Emery, a sophisticated and attractive American heiress. Her father was a self-made millionaire and after his death, her mother had married a son of the second Earl of Lichfield. Grand Duke Dmitri had no fortune to offer, but they fell in love and they were married in the Orthodox Church at Biarritz on 21 November 1926. It was a morganatic marriage, and Audrey, who converted to Russian Orthodoxy and took the name Anna Ioannovna in baptism, was granted the title Her Serene Highness, Princess Romanovskaya-Ilyinskaya by his cousin, Grand Duke Kyril. They spent their honeymoon in England where they established their first home. The couple's only child, Paul Romanovsky-Ilyinsky, was born in London in 1928. Paul grew up in France, Britain, and the United States; he served as a US Marine in the Korean War. In 1989, he was elected Mayor of Palm Beach, Florida, and thus became the only Romanov descendant known to have held elected public office. Following the fall of communist Russia in 1991, a delegation of Russian royalists approached him and asked him to assume the title of Tsar, which he declined.

In 1928, the Dowager Empress died, and Grand Duke Kirill was received at the funeral as head of the House of Romanoff by the royal family of Denmark – it was the last time that the entire dynasty appeared as a single undivided family and Grand Duke Dmitri was a prominent figure in the proceedings. The youngest of the Grand Dukes, Dmitri Pavlovich frequently represented Grand Duke Kirill at events public, private, and political. He was prominent at the funerals of King Constantine I of Greece (1923), Queen Astrid of the Belgians (1935), at the wedding of Grand Duke Kirill's daughter, Grand Duchess Kira to Prince Louis Ferdinand of Prussia (1938), and also at the ceremonies surrounding the accession of Grand Duke Vladimir Kirillovich of Russia to the rights of the headship of the imperial house on the death of his father in 1938.

Grand Duke Dmitri was a noted collector of model trains and was at one point considered to have had one of the largest collections in Europe. During the Nazi annexation of Paris, Dmitri's collection vanished, and it has since been theorized that they were seized by Hermann Göring, a model train collector himself.

In the late 1920s, Grand Duke Dmitri became involved with his cousin, Prince Dmitri Alexandrovich Romanoff in the monarchist youth organizations which sprang up in the years between the wars. By 1923, the largest of these was the Union of Young Russians which was renamed the Union of Mladorossi (Cоюз Младороссов) by 1925. It was a Russian nationalist group influenced by Italian Fascism, formed with the express purpose of establishing a "Soviet monarchy" in Russia. He joined this group as a stand-in for Grand Duke Kirill Vladimirovich, who, as pretender to the throne, could not affiliate himself directly with any political organization or party. In 1935, Grand Duke Dmitri gave a series of speeches to Young Russia chapters throughout France. Over the course of the next few years, however, he grew very disillusioned with the group, and he ultimately broke with it entirely. He loathed Hitler and National Socialism, and he spoke out publicly against Hitler in January 1939. Grand Duke Dmitri reputedly rebuked later advances from Hitler to lead exiled Russian nobles within the German army against the Bolsheviks with the firm statement that nothing would induce him to fight against fellow Russians.

== Last years ==
Grand Duke Dmitri Pavlovich and his wife could afford a very opulent lifestyle with homes in London, Biarritz, Neuilly-sur-Seine, and Château de Beaumesnil near Caen, and visits to America. After ten years of marriage, they were divorced in 1937. Dmitri then lived at the Château de Beaumesnil in Beaumesnil, Eure, France, which he had bought in 1927. Over the years, Dmitri became disappointed with the prospects for the restoration of the monarchy in Russia and withdrew from public life. He lived at the Château de Beaumesnil until 1938 when, due to the deterioration of his health, he sold the château.

In 1937, his ex-wife remarried. His son was at school in England, but Dmitri could spend the school holidays with him until 1939, when it was decided to send Paul to America for safety. They saw each other for the last time in Genoa spending three days before Paul embarked to America.

Despite not having strong health, Grand Duke Dmitri was, for most of his life, a very active sportsman, excelling at polo, horse riding, tennis, and bobsledding. His doctors in London and Davos estimated that he first contracted tuberculosis around 1929, which ran a chronic course. He entered the Sanatorium Schatzalp in Davos, Switzerland on 2 September 1939, the day after the German invasion of Poland, and remarked in a letter to his sister that he had never before spent a single night in any kind of hospital or medical institution. His health began a steady decline in August 1940. In the autumn of that year, he underwent an unsuccessful operation and was confined to bed for three months afterward. After two more operations, in January and February 1941, the doctors spoke optimistically. From the safety of the sanatorium in Davos, Dmitri followed with great interest the events of World War II; he wrote to a friend on 10 April 1940, on the eve of the collapse of France, "everything starts looking petty in comparison with world events".

On 4 March 1942, Grand Duke Dmitri organized a Russian festival to entertain himself with his friend and the staff. The celebration continued until late into the night. The following morning Dmitri suffered a sudden attack of uremia and died at the age of fifty. He was laid to rest in the Waldfriedhof, Davos. After the death of Dmitri's sister Maria Pavlovna in December 1958, his nephew, Prince Lennart Bernadotte, had him buried alongside his sister, in the chapel of his castle on the island of Mainau in Lake Constance, where they now lie beside his sister in the Bernadotte family crypt.

== Ancestors ==
Ancestors of Grand Duke Dmitri Pavlovich of Russia

8. Nicholas I of Russia
4. Alexander II of Russia
9. Princess Charlotte of Prussia
2. Grand Duke Paul Alexandrovich of Russia
10. Louis II, Grand Duke of Hesse and by Rhine
5. Princess Marie of Hesse and by Rhine
11. Princess Wilhelmine of Baden
1. Grand Duke Dmitri Pavlovich of Russia
12. Christian IX of Denmark
6. George I of Greece
13. Princess Louise of Hesse-Kassel
3. Princess Alexandra of Greece and Denmark
14. Grand Duke Constantine Nikolaevich of Russia
7. Grand Duchess Olga Constantinovna of Russia
15. Princess Alexandra of Saxe-Altenburg
