= Taneyevka (disambiguation) =

Taneyevka (Russian: Танеевка), rural localities in Russia, may refer to:

- Taneyevka, Bashkortostan, a selo
- Taneyevka, Kursk Oblast, a khutor
- Taneyevka, Lipetsk Oblast, a village
- Taneyevka, Mordovia, a village
- Taneyevka, Oryol Oblast, a village
- Taneyevka, Luninsky District, Penza Oblast, a selo
- Taneyevka, Penzensky District, Penza Oblast, a village

== See also ==
- Taneyev
