= Marianne Pistohlkors =

Russian aristocrat and actress (1890–1976)

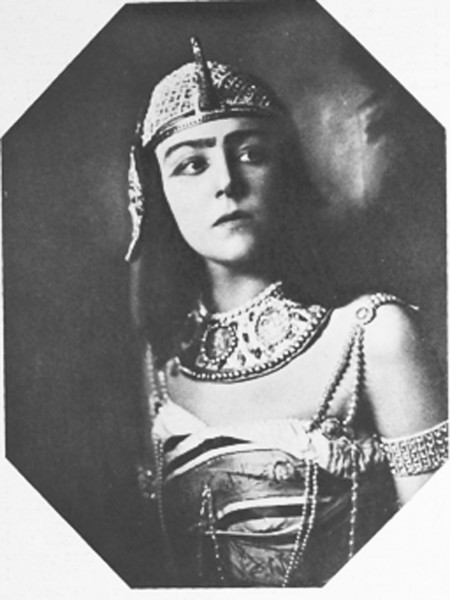
- Marianne in a masquerade costume (1914)
- Born: Marianna Erikovna von Pistohlkors; 30 June 1890; Saint Petersburg, Russia
- Died: 14 May 1976 (aged 85)
- Mother: Princess Olga Paley

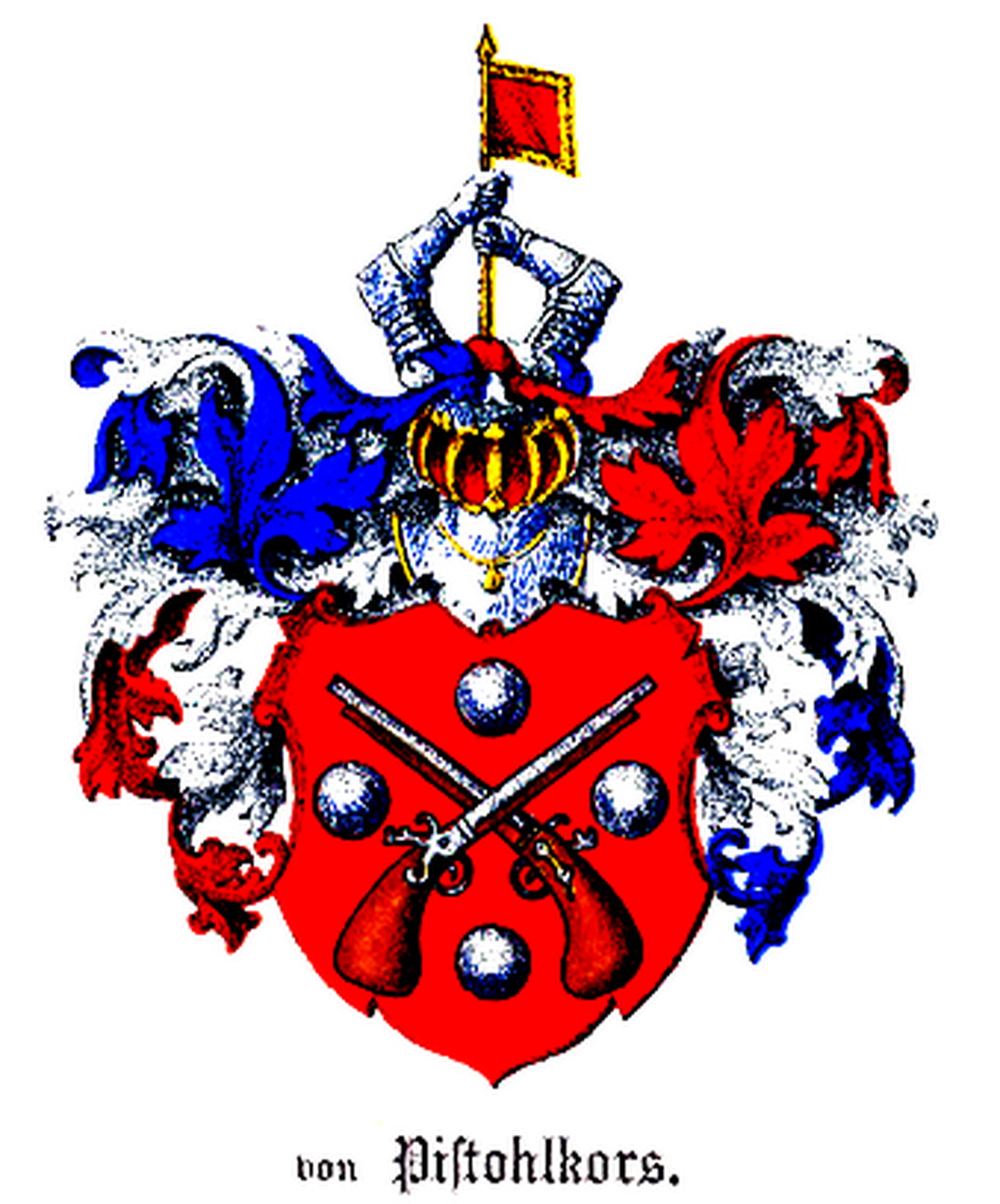
Arms of the Pistohlkors family

Marianne von Pistohlkors, born Marianna Erikovna von Pistohlkors (Russian: Марианна Эриковна фон Пистолькорс; June 30, 1890 – May 14, 1976) was a Russian-born aristocrat and later an actress. She was a suspected co-conspirator in the murder of Grigori Rasputin. As the first wife of Count Nicholas von Zarnekau, she was known for many years as Countess Marianne von Zarnekau. She became one of the first women of nobility to attend the Imperial School of Dramatic Arts, and she appeared under the stage name of Mariana Fiory in MGM's 1944 film, Song of Russia.

== Early life ==
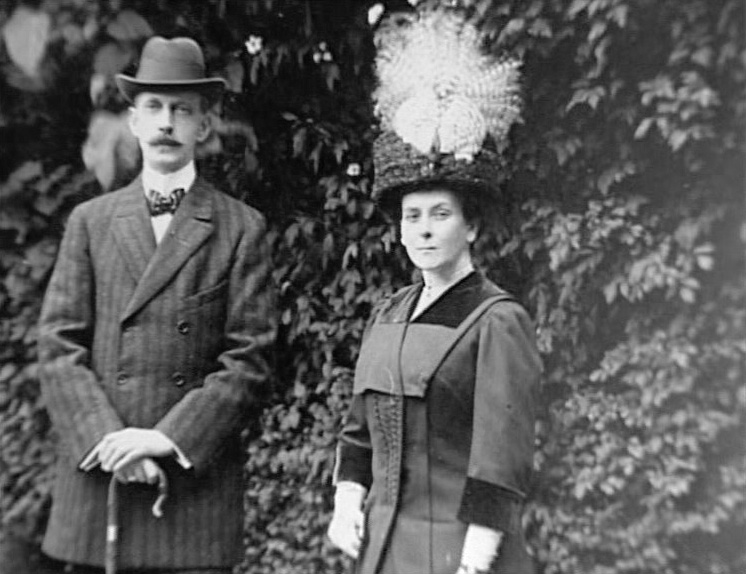
Grand Duke Paul and Princess Olga Paley

Born in Saint Petersburg, Russia, she was a daughter of Olga Valerianovna Karnovich and her first husband, Major General Erik Augustinovich von Pistohlkors. He was an adjutant to Grand Duke Vladimir Alexandrovich of Russia, the Tsar's uncle.

As a child, Marianne had an older brother, Alexander Erikovich von Pistohlkors, and an older sister, Olga Erikovna von Pistohlkors. When she was still a young girl, her mother began an affair with the widowed Grand Duke Paul Alexandrovich of Russia, causing a scandal in society. The affair resulted in the birth of a son out of wedlock, Vladimir Paley, who later became a famous poet.

Olga Valerianovna von Pistohlkors eventually obtained a divorce and married Grand Duke Paul on 10 October 1902 in a Greek Orthodox Church in Livorno, Italy. Since the couple had deliberately disrespected the authority of Tsar Nicholas II by marrying without his permission, they were banished from Russia and moved to France.

In 1904, Grand Duke Paul arranged through Prince Regent Leopold of Bavaria for his wife and her children to be granted titles of nobility. They were styled as Count/Countess von Hohenfelsen and granted a coat of arms.

Only after much pleading by relatives did the Tsar finally relent in 1905 and allow them to return to St. Petersburg. Olga was then granted the Russian title of Princess Paley, and her son, Vladimir, became Prince Paley. Unlike morganatic wives of other Romanov Grand Dukes, Olga never bore the title of "Princess Romanowsky", a name that would have associated her visibly with the Imperial Family. As was customary with morganatic Romanov marriages, moreover, neither Olga nor her children were ever considered to be dynastic members of the Imperial House before the Revolution of 1917.

Marianne von Pistohlkors thus became, at age 15, a countess, and later the daughter of a princess. Upon the Grand Duke's return from France to St. Petersburg in 1905, Marianne also gained two siblings, children of her stepfather's first marriage, whom she had not previously known: a step-sister, Grand Duchess Maria Pavlovna of Russia, and a step-brother, Grand Duke Dimitri Pavlovich of Russia.

Grand Duchess Maria Pavlovna became a Princess of Sweden and wrote a series of well-received memoirs. Grand Duke Dmitri was an excellent horseman who participated in the 1912 Stockholm Olympics and later, along with Marianne, became a suspect in Rasputin's murder.

While Marianne attended school, her mother gave birth to two more daughters: Irène (1903–1990) and Natalie, known as "Natasha" (1905–1981). Both girls went on to become fashion models in the 1920s, and Natalia Paley later became a Hollywood movie star.

Between 1905 and the time of Rasputin's murder in 1916, Princess Olga Paley worked hard to make the court of Grand Duke Paul a popular rival to that of the Tsar. The family entertained many important figures in St. Petersburg society, and the house thus became a center of court intrigue.

According to Gen. Alexander Spiridovich, chief of the Tsar's Secret Personal Police, it was this rivalry between the competing salons of St. Petersburg that eventually resulted in the monk Gregory Rasputin being introduced to the Imperial Family. Rasputin arrived at St. Petersburg in 1907, won admirers, and was adopted in 1908 by Anna Vyrubova, a close friend of the Tsarina.

== Marriages ==
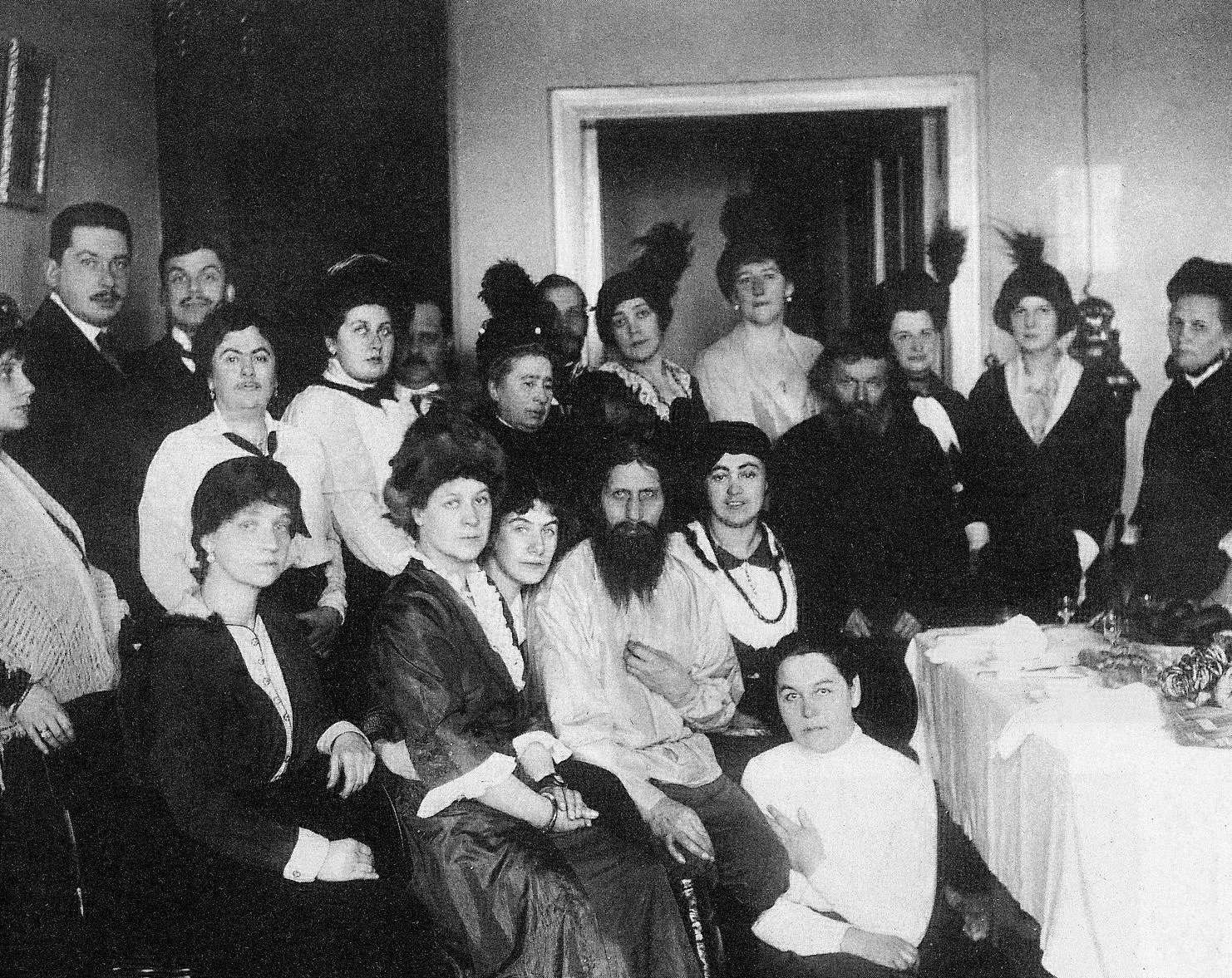
Alexander von Pistohlkors and his pregnant wife, Alexandra Taneyeva (both at far left), at a gathering of Rasputin's admirers in 1914

Marianne's older brother, Alexander Erikovich von Pistohlkors, was married to Alexandra Taneyeva, the sister of the Tsarina's lady in waiting, Anna Vyrubova. Alexander and his wife were thus drawn into Rasputin's circle of supporters, and their conversation at family gatherings strongly affected the opinions of Princess Olga and Grand Duke Paul.

According to Burke's Peerage, Marianne herself married three times: firstly in 1908 to Lt. Col. Peter Petrovich Durnovo, the son of the Tsar's chief of secret police, P.N. Durnovo, and a classmate of Marianne's older brother Alexander; secondly in 1912 to Christopher von Derfelden, another of Alexander's classmates in the Horse Guard; and thirdly, on 30 October 1917, to Count Nicholas Constantinovich von Zarnekau, a cornette in the Horse Guard and the son of Duke Constantine Petrovich of Oldenburg.

== Murder of Rasputin ==
During World War I, when things began going badly on the Russian Front, the newspapers accused Rasputin of exercising a dark and malevolent influence over the Tsar and Tsarina. Considering it their duty to defend the empire and the honor of the Imperial dynasty, family members (and left and right wing parties in the Imperial Duma) began to plot against him, her and Rasputin.

Marianne von Pistohlkors was allegedly one of two women and several men present in the palace belonging to Felix Yussupov on the night that Rasputin was lured there on 17 December 1916. "Malanya's also taking part," Yussupov wrote to his wife Princess Irina of Russia in the weeks before the murder. Pistohlkors' nickname was Malanya.

She, like Grand Duke Dimitri, was later arrested by the Tsar's secret police following the murder. However, the Tsar later ordered her release. Sympathies were on Pistohlkors' side, according to her mother's memoirs, Memories of Russia 1916-1919. "When we arrived at 8 Theatre Square, where Marianne lived, we were stopped by two soldiers who let us through only after taking down our names. All the highest society was at Marianne's! Some ladies she barely knew arrived in order to express sympathy with her. Officers came up to kiss her hand."

None of the male co-conspirators ever publicly denounced Pistohlkors or the other woman suspected of involvement, ballerina and film star Vera Karalli. Neither were these women prosecuted in the subsequent legal trials. Allegedly, during questioning, she said:

"Unfortunately, I did not participate, and I regret that...I just don't understand why they make such a spectacle out of this man's murder. If I had killed my concierge, nobody would have batted an eye. Honour and Glory to the noble hero and patriot who dared to take this bold step to save his fatherland and dynasty."

According to one author, the Tsar kept their names out of the case because he did not want more public displays of sympathy for the murderers of Rasputin. He also knew that his sickly uncle, Grand Duke Paul, was very upset by Dimitri's involvement in the murder and was taking badly the Tsar's decision to exile Dmitri to the Persian front. The Tsar presumably did not want to add to the grand duke's suffering by also charging his stepdaughter.

== Exile ==
In March 1918, Marianne's half-brother, the poet Prince Vladimir Paley, was arrested by the Bolsheviks and sent to the Urals. He was executed there on 18 July 1918, and his body was dumped in a mine shaft near Alapayevsk.

At about this time, Marianne and her new husband, Count Nicholas von Zarnekau, made an effort to help the remaining family of the Grand Duke Paul to escape. According to the memoirs of Marianne's stepsister, Grand Duchess Maria Pavlovna, "Once in the beginning of July [1918], late at night, when we had been long asleep, there was a knock at my door. Waking, I saw upon the threshold of my bedroom Marianne Zarnekau, one of my stepmother's daughters by her first marriage. She explained that we must immediately dress and go to Petrograd. She had come from there in an automobile to fetch us. According to information which had come to her the uprising of the Bolsheviks was set for the next day . . . "

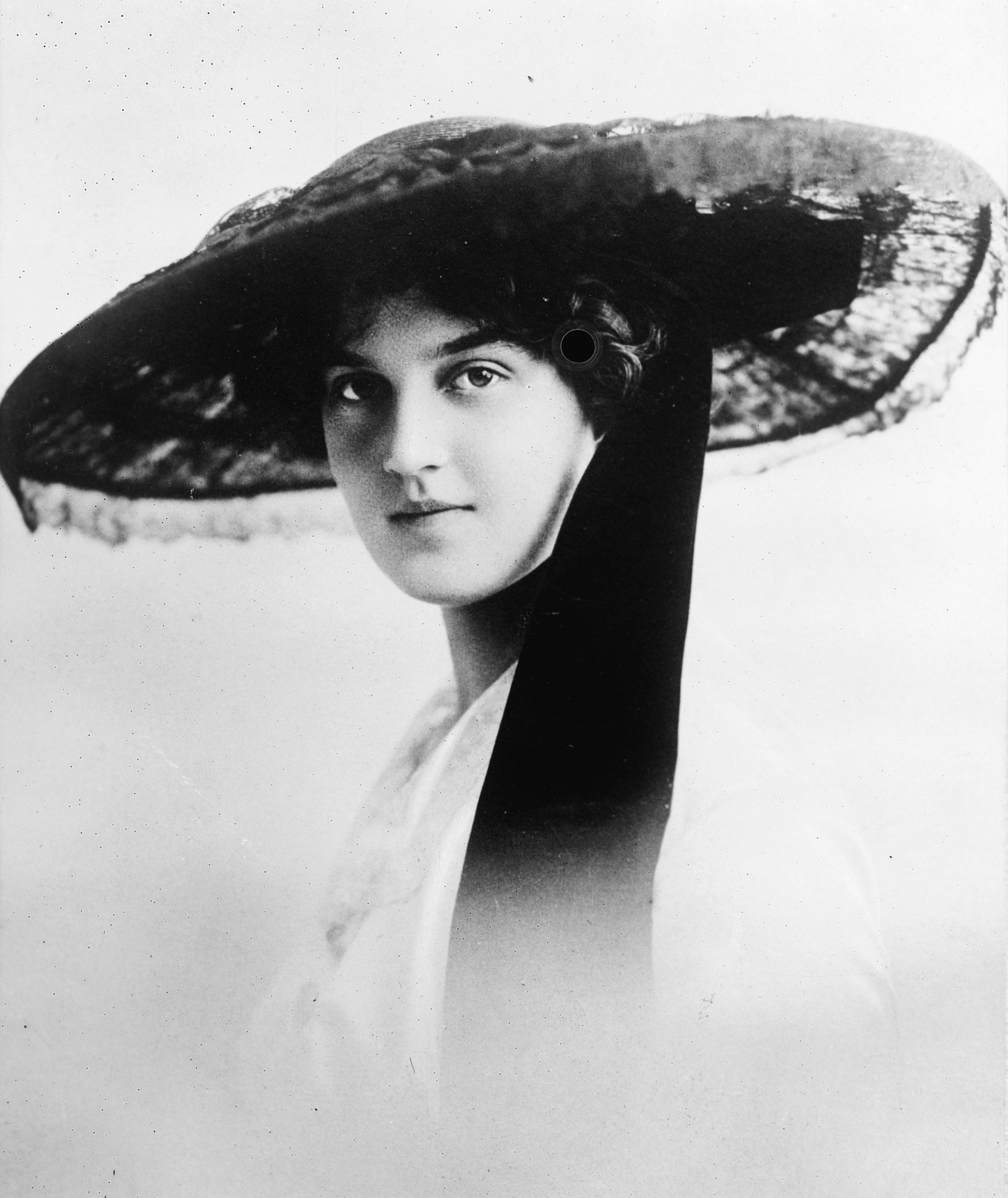
Grand Duchess Maria Pavlovna of Russia (1890–1958), step-sister of Marianne von Pistohlkors

It proved a false alarm and the family returned to their homes in St. Petersburg, a decision that was a fatal error. The Grand Duke Paul Alexandrovich was arrested in August 1918, sent to the St. Peter and St. Paul Fortress, and despite constant pleas for his release by Princess Paley, he was shot on 29 January 1919 and buried in a mass grave. His remains were not discovered until 2011.

The Grand Duchess Maria Pavlovna and her second husband, Prince Sergei Mikhailovitch Putiatin (1893–1966), chose to stay in St. Petersburg, finally escaping to Romania in 1919. Princess Olga Paley escaped via Finland in 1920, and died in Paris on 2 December 1929, at age 64.

Marianne and Nicholas von Zarnekau managed to escape from Russia some time after 1923 with the help of her first husband, Peter Dournovo (1883–1945), who arranged for their passage to Finland. They settled in Belgium, and Marianne is mentioned in Anthony Summer's book The File on the Tsar:

"Countess de Zarnekau, an ex-patriate living in Brussels, told how in about 1923 a nun arrived at their home in Moscow and announced mysteriously that the Tsar and all the family were alive 'somewhere close to the border'. She asked for, and was given, wooly socks to warm the imperial feet. Those who had been able to deal with the little matter of the Tsar's rescue were now apparently having trouble in getting him the right size in socks."

== Acting career ==
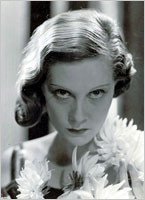
Natalie Paley, younger sister of Marianne von Pistohlkors, became a Hollywood starlet in the 1930s.

In 1930, Marianne divorced Count von Zarnekau, her third husband, and launched her acting career in Europe under the stage name of "Mariana Fiory". In February 1930, she appeared at the Theatre Mathurins in Paris, starring in the role of a German soldier's grieving fiancée in "The Man I Killed," a dramatization of the war novel L'Homme que j'ai tue. Playwright Maurice Rostrand reportedly wrote the play specifically for Marianne. The show was a hit and won glowing reviews. Marianne went on to Rome, to star opposite Emma Gramatica, a popular Italian film actress of the 1930s.

Mariana Fiory, the former Countess von Zarnekau, arrived in the United States in 1936. She first appeared on the New York stage in February 1937 as the lead in Michel Dulud's play "Dans le Noir" at the Barbizon-Plaza theatre. Mariana then appeared in "The Shining Hour" with a stock company in New Hampshire, and apparently decided to settle in the U.S.

Through a friendship with Wally Castelbarco, the daughter of composer Arturo Toscanini, the ex-Countess was signed to appear on NBC. The Schenectady NY Gazette for 7 January 1938 reported "One of Europe's noted actresses, Mariana Fiory, once a member of the Russian royal family, is to make her first appearance in American radio when she plays in the Radio Guild on WJZ-NBC at 2. The production is Ibsen's Rosmersholm."

In late 1938, Marianne played "Tessie Konstantin" in the Broadway production of the satire "Waltz in Goose Step" at the Hudson Theatre.

The Brooklyn NY Daily Eagle spotlighted her with a brief interview on 5 November 1938. "The Countess Mariana Zarnekau, daughter of Grand Duke Paul and cousin of the late Russian Czar, scorns titles, knows nothing about dictators, and has no quarrels with Stalinists, but 'adores' the stage and the Brooklyn waterfront."

Marianne told the reporter she was "very, very ready" to discourse at length on the worthlessness of royal connections. "What did the revolution do for me? Why it set me free, and gave me the chance to fulfill a lifelong ambition to enter the old Imperial Dramatic School and study for the stage."

In October 1939, Hollywood columnist May Mann caught up with Mariana Fiory at a smart Russian perfume bar on Fifth Avenue and heard a similar story. "I was too young. I did not know what the revolution was all about. We left our palaces and lived crowded in rooms. We were glad to have our lives. . . . I married Count Zarnekau, and we were terribly poor. All of our properties had been seized and we had nothing. I helped to found the first dramatic school in Communistic Russia. Then I went to Paris and starred many seasons on the stage. . . . This spring I starred in 'Window Panes.' I do not long for the old Russia. America is so much more interesting."

During World War II, Marianne moved to California, where she appeared with Robert Taylor and several Russian actors in the MGM movie "Song of Russia" (1944), the story of an American symphonic conductor, trapped in Russia during World War II, who helps with the resistance. Marianne plays "Nina." Produced by Joseph Pasternak and directed by Gregory Ratoff, "Song of Russia" premiered in February 1944.
