= Alexander Taneyev =

Russian composer (1850–1918)

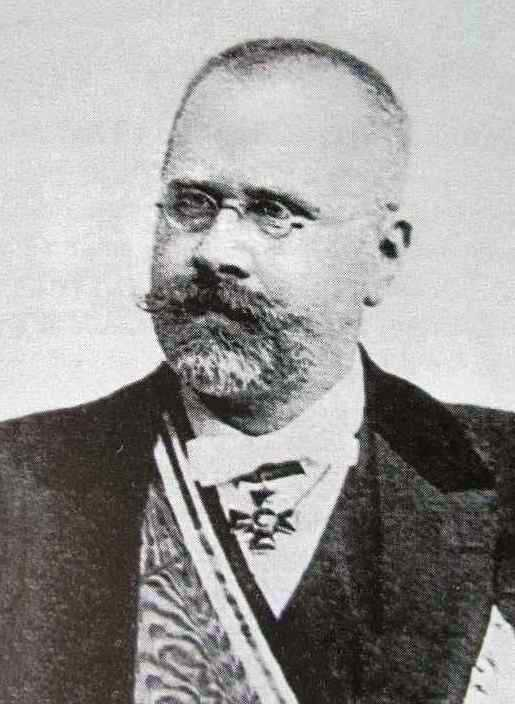
Alexander Taneyev in 1904

Alexander Sergeyevich Taneyev (Russian: Алекса́ндр Серге́евич Тане́ев, also transliterated as Taneiev, Tanaiev, Taneieff, and Taneyeff in English; January 17, 1850, Saint Petersburg – February 7, 1918, Petrograd) was a Russian state official and composer of the late Romantic era, specifically of the nationalist school. Among his better-known works were three string quartets, believed to have been composed between 1898 and 1900.

Alexander Taneyev is not well known outside Russia. His name is often confused with that of his distant cousin Sergei Taneyev (1856–1915).

A member of Russian aristocracy, Taneyev was a high-ranking state official, serving for 22 years as the head of His Imperial Majesty's Own Chancellery. His daughter Anna Vyrubova was a lady-in-waiting and best friend of Tsarina Alexandra. Vyrubova is best known for her friendship with the Romanov family and with the starets Grigori Rasputin.

== Background ==
Alexander Taneyev inherited an enthusiasm for music from his parents. He was dissuaded from pursuing a career as a musician due to his position in the Russian upper class. After studying at university, he entered the Russian civil service, succeeding his father as director of the Imperial Chancellery. After 1900 he was the head of the folksong collection project of the Russian Geographical Society. Several of the songs collected during this period were later arranged and published by Anatoly Lyadov.

Taneyev pursued musical studies in Germany and later in Petersburg, where he became a student of Nikolai Rimsky-Korsakov. Taneyev's situation at this time bore similarities to that of fellow composer Alexander Borodin. Both were composers whose main occupation was not in music (Borodin was a chemistry professor; Taneyev held a bureaucratic post). It was rumored that Taneyev kept a score that he was working on hidden beneath official documents so that he might pen a few notes between appointments.

Taneyev's compositional output was large: two operas, four symphonies, several pieces for orchestra, numerous choral works, and a considerable amount of chamber music including three string quartets. The influence on his work of the other Russian composers, such as Rimsky-Korsakov, Balakirev and Lyadov, is often noted.

== Selected works ==
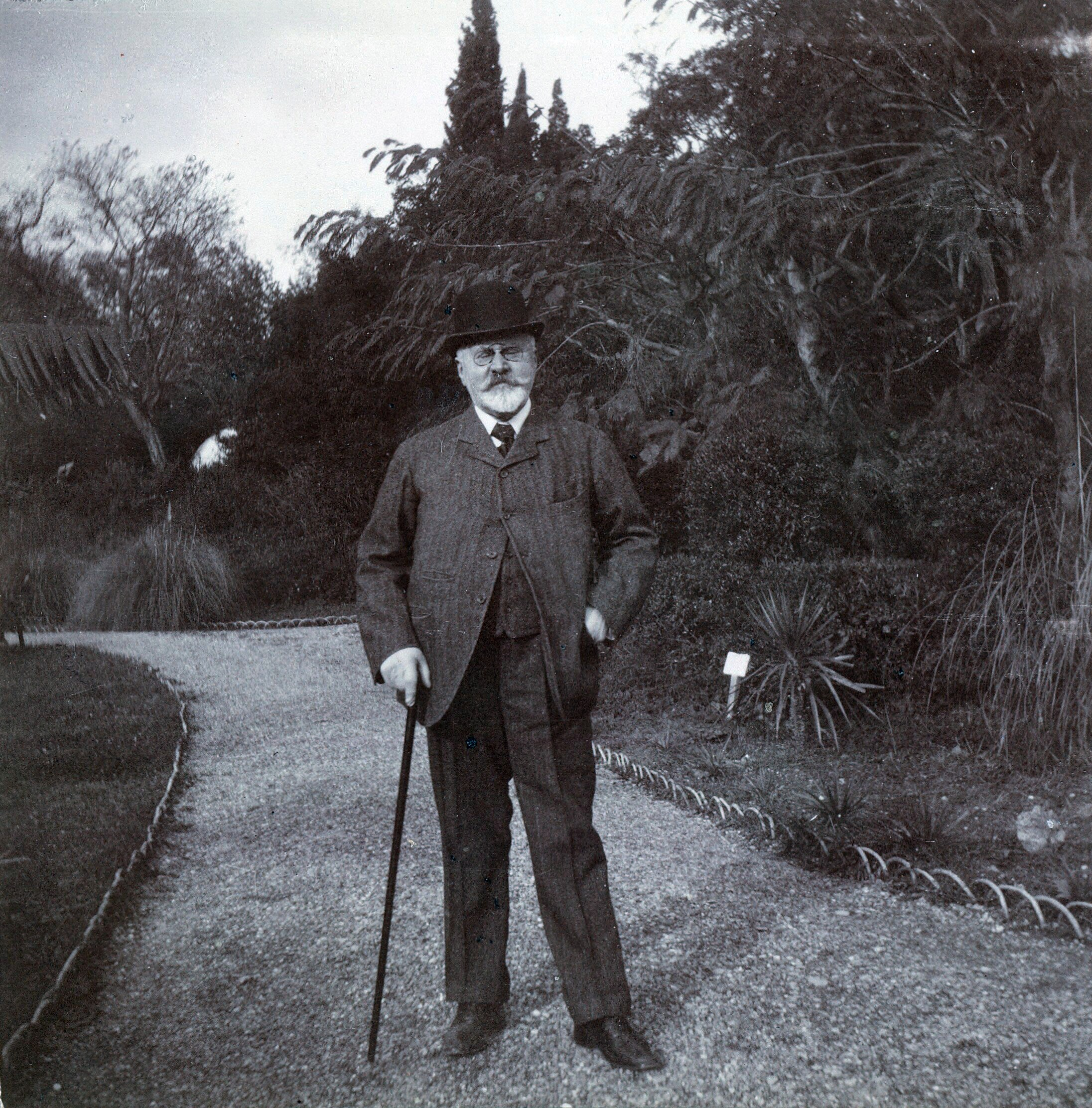
Alexander Sergeyevich Taneyev

Operas

- Cupid's Revenge (Месть Амура), opera, Op. 13 (1899); libretto by Tatyana Lvovna Shchepkina-Kupernik
- The Blizzard (Метель), opera in 2 acts, 4 scenes (1914); libretto by V. Svetlov after poems of D. Tsertelev

Orchestral

- Suite No. 1, Op. 9
- Festive March (Торжественный марш), Op. 12
- Suite No. 2 in F major, Op. 14
- Symphony No. 2 in B♭ minor, Op. 21 (1903)
- Hamlet, Overture, Op. 31 (pub. 1906)

Concertante

- Rêverie for violin and orchestra, Op. 23

Chamber music

- Petite valse for violin and piano
- Bagatelle and Serenade for cello and piano, Op.10
- Arabesque for clarinet and piano, Op. 24
- String Quartet No. 1 in G major, Op. 25
- String Quartet No. 2 in C major, Op. 28
- String Quartet No. 3 in A major, Op. 30
- Album Leaf (Листок из альбома) in G major for viola and piano, Op. 33

Piano

- Valse-caprice in A♭ major
- Valse-caprice in D♭ major
- Mazurka No. 1, Op. 15
- Mazurka No. 3 "Souvenir de Bade", Op. 20
- Bluette, Op. 22

== Personal life ==
Taneyev married Countess Nadezhda Illarionovna Tolstoy (1860-1937), a descendant of Field Marshal Mikhail Kutuzov, Prince of Smolensk. They had three children:

- Anna Alexandrovna (1884-1964); lady-in-waiting of Empress Alexandra Feodorovna; was married to Alexander Vasiljevich Vyrubov (1880-1919)
- Sergei Alexandrovich (1886-1975); married Princess Tinatin Ilyinichna Jorjadze (before 1900-1990) and had issue
- Alexandra Alexandrovna (1888-1968), who married Alexander Erikovich von Pistohlkors, the stepson of Grand Duke Paul Alexandrovich of Russia.
