= Taneyev =

Taneyev or Taneev (Russian: Танеев) is a Russian masculine surname, its feminine counterpart is Taneyeva or Taneeva. It may refer to

- Aleksandr Taneyev (1850–1918), Russian nationalist composer
- Anna Vyrubova (née Taneyeva, 1884–1964), best friend and confidante of Russian Tsaritsa Alexandra Fyodorovna
- Sergei Taneyev (1856–1915), Russian composer, distant cousin of Aleksandr
