= Bīriņi Palace =

Palace in Latvia

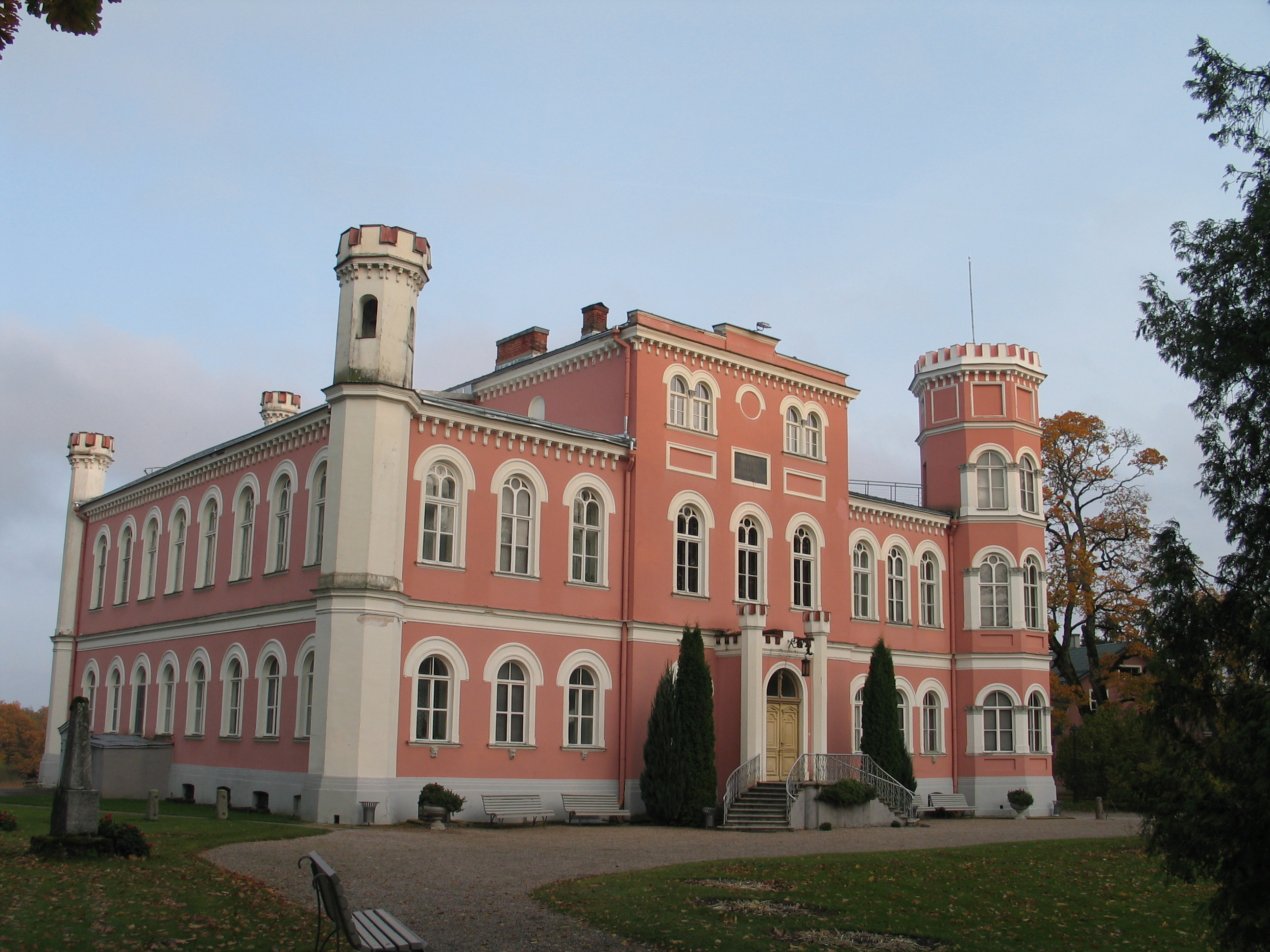

- Location within Latvia

General information
- Architectural style: Neo-Gothic
- Location: Limbaži municipality, Latvia
- Coordinates: 57°14′38″N 24°39′34″E
- Construction started: 1857
- Completed: 1860
- Client: August von Pistohlkors

Design and construction
- Architect: Friedrich Wilhelm Hess

Bīriņi Palace (Latvian: Bīriņu pils; German: Buringshof) is a palace in the village of Bīriņi^{(lv)} in the Vidriži Parish of Limbaži Municipality, in the Vidzeme region of Latvia. The castle is surrounded by scenic parks, lakes, a manor house hotel, restaurant, rooms for weddings and seminars. Health serves itself from a variety of activities among horse riding, cycling and boating.

== History ==
Bīriņi Palace was built by Riga architect Friedrich Wilhelm Hess between 1857 and 1860 for Baltic-German baron August von Pistohlkors. It has two floors with higher three floor risalit in the centre. All four corners of the building are adorned with towers – three of these towers are small, decorative but southwestern tower is larger. The palace is asymmetric as this was required by the rules of Neo-Gothic. It is surrounded by large landscape park. In the park there is the tomb of the von Pistohlkors family, although they were vandalised during the soviet period.

The interiors of the castle is done in Neo-Renaissance style with a wide entrance hall, balcony and double oak staircase featuring wood engravings. The dining hall has a molded wood ceiling and opens onto a terrace that descends to the lake. There is a richly decorated hall on the second floor of the palace with original light tile stoves.

Palace was rebuilt in the beginning of 20th century after the project of architect Rudolf Heinrich Zirkwitz. During these works facade was simplified, made less ornate. After the rebuilding in 1926 the palace was turned into health resort for employees of printing industry. Since this time up to 1995 there were various health resorts in the palace.

During the Soviet period the interior of the palace was adorned with paintings glorifying Soviet ideology. In 1994, the palace was rented and now it is a private property. Palace, buildings and landscape around it have been reconstructed since 1995, there being also a hotel in the palace.

== See also ==
- List of palaces and manor houses in Latvia
