= Pistolekors =

Baltic German noble family

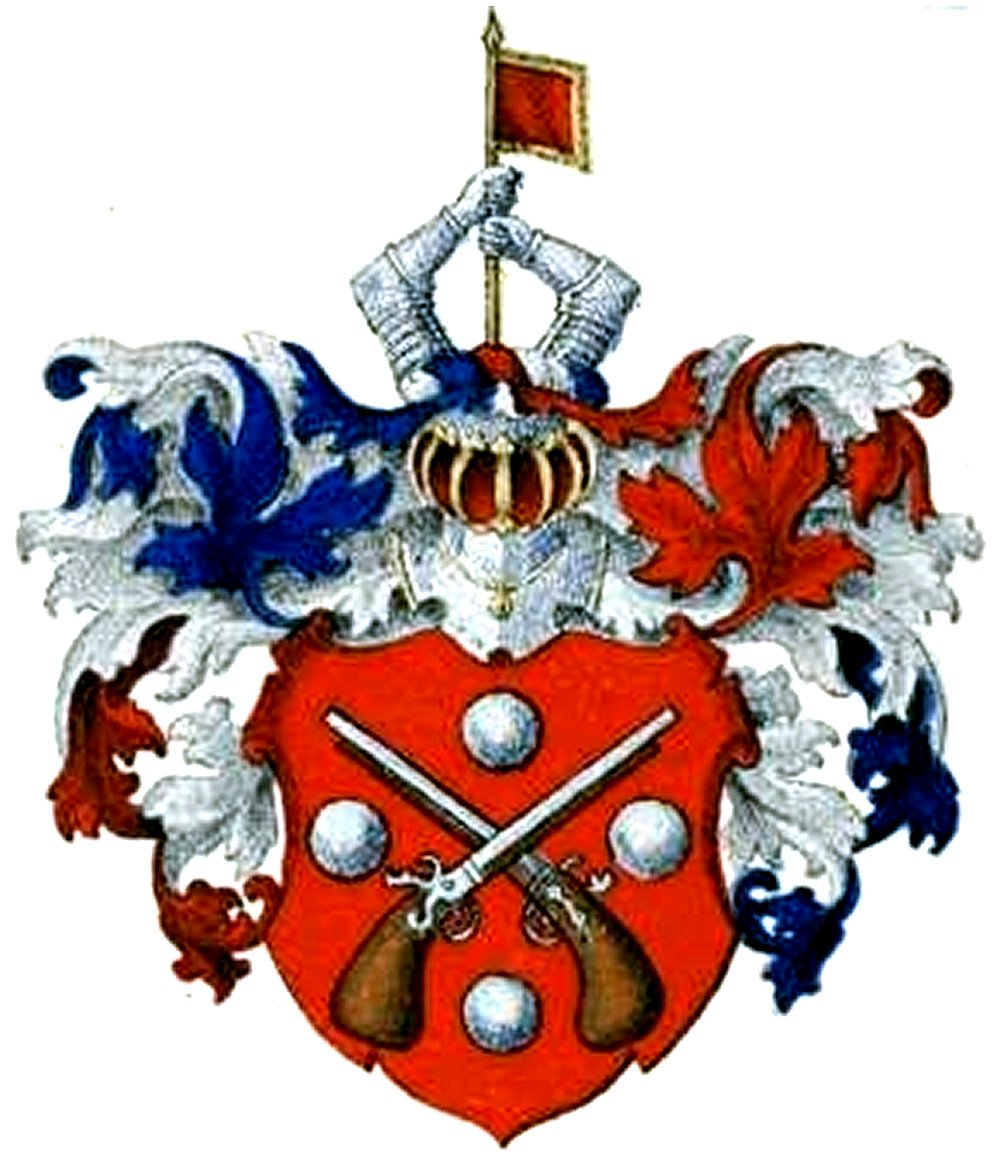
Pistolkors family coat of arms

The Pistolekors family (also von Pistohlkors) is a Baltic-German noble family of Finnish origin. It is immatriculated into Swedish House of Nobility 1647 and into Finnish House of Nobility 1818. Nowadays the family still lives in Germany and Baltic States.

== History ==
The progenitor of the family was a soldier Yrjänä Ollinpoika (Göran Olofsson) from Sääminki, who was ennobled by Queen Christina by letters patent 22 February 1645, according to the unverified story for saving the life of King Gustavus Adolphus with a pistol in Sztum 1629. His six sons became officers, Erik is the ancestor of the branch in Livonia (von Pistohlkors), Abraham became the commandant of Olavinlinna.

In older genealogical literature it has been said that the Pistolekors family descended from the Scotts of Craighall, but there is no proof to that, more likely from Partanen family, as based on literature, Yrjänä Ollinpoika was using Partanen seal.

== Notable members ==
- Laura Netzel, née Pistolekors (1839–1927), composer
- Olga Pistohlkors (1865–1929), later Princess Paley, second wife of Grand Duke Paul Alexandrovich of Russia
- Alexander Pistohlkors (1885–1941), guard officer
- Alexandra Pistohlkors (née Taneyeva; 1888–1963)
- Marianne Pistohlkors (1890–1976), actress

== Literature ==
- "Пистолькорс" . Brockhaus and Efron Encyclopedic Dictionary (in Russian). 1906.
- Nuolivaara, Kirsti (1999) Pistolekorsit-Keitä he olivat? Savonlinnan pääkirjasto, Family history books (ykl 99.31) www.finna.fi
- Pistohlkors, Harry Nikolai von. Nachrichten über die Adelsgeschlechter Scott of Craighall, Pistolekors und von Pistohlkors. Im Auftrag des Familienverbandes derer von Pistohlkors zusammengestellt in den Jahren 1894−1914. Teil I. Dorpat: Gedruckt bei H. Laakmann, 1914.
- Baron Scott gen. Pistohlkors, Heinrich Nikolai. Nachrichten über die Adelsgeschlechter Scott of Craighall, Pistolekors, von Pistohlkors, Baron Pistolkors, Baron Scott genannt Pistolekors und von Pistohlkors. Teil II. Zusammengestellt in den Jahren 1914−1924. Rummelsburg: Gedruckt bei Otto Hasert, 1926.
- Pistohlkors, Erik von. Pistolekors, von Pistohlkors, Baron de Pistolkors and Pistolkors: the story of a family and their times through four centuries, who they were, how they lived and what became of them. Callander: s.n., 1992.
