= Alexander Pistohlkors =

Russian Army officer (1885–1941)

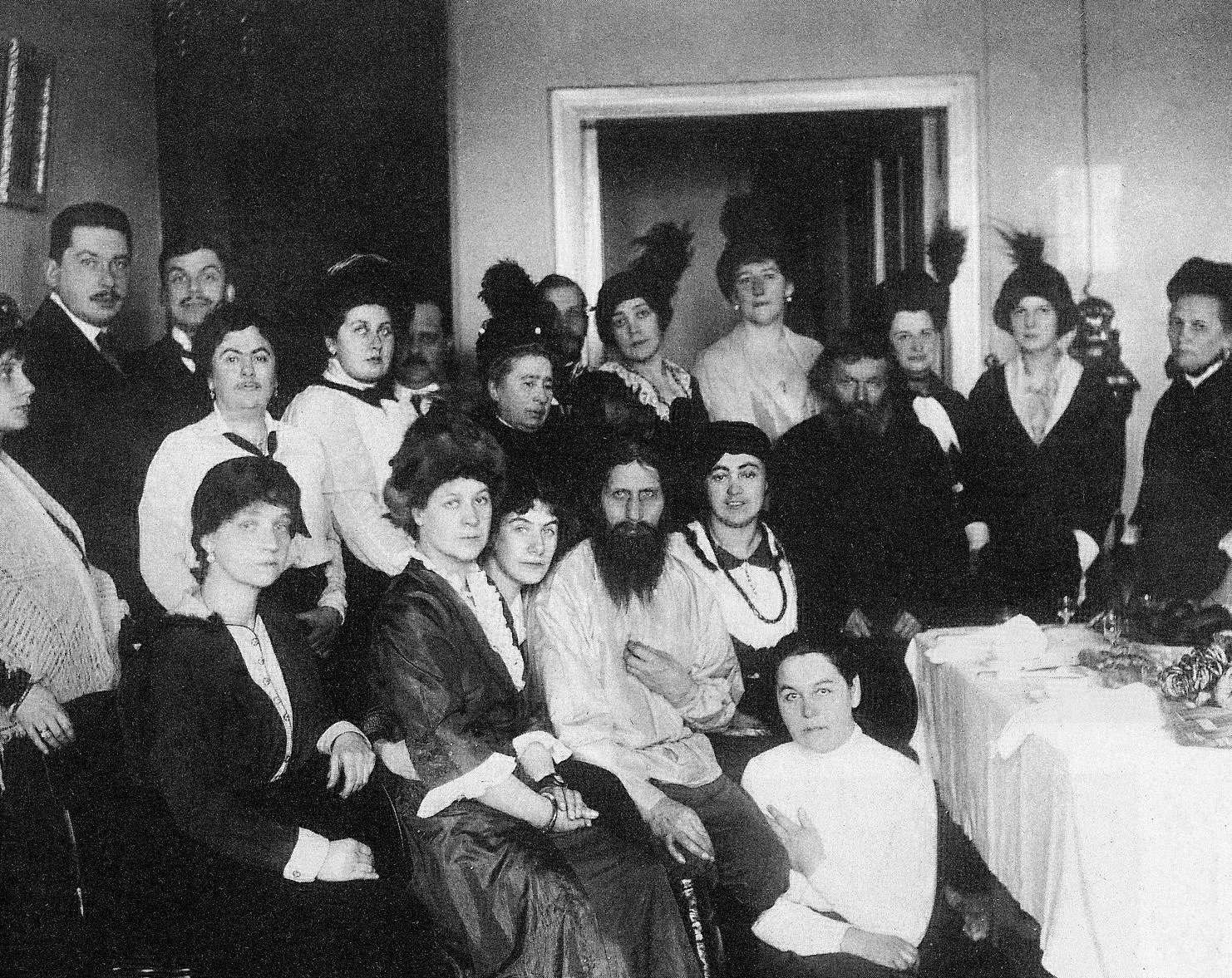
A pregnant Alexandra Pistohlkors, standing at far left, and her husband Alexander Pistohlkors, second from left, are pictured with Grigori Rasputin and other admirers in his apartment in 1914. Alexandra's sister Anna Vyrubova is in the back row, standing fourth from left.

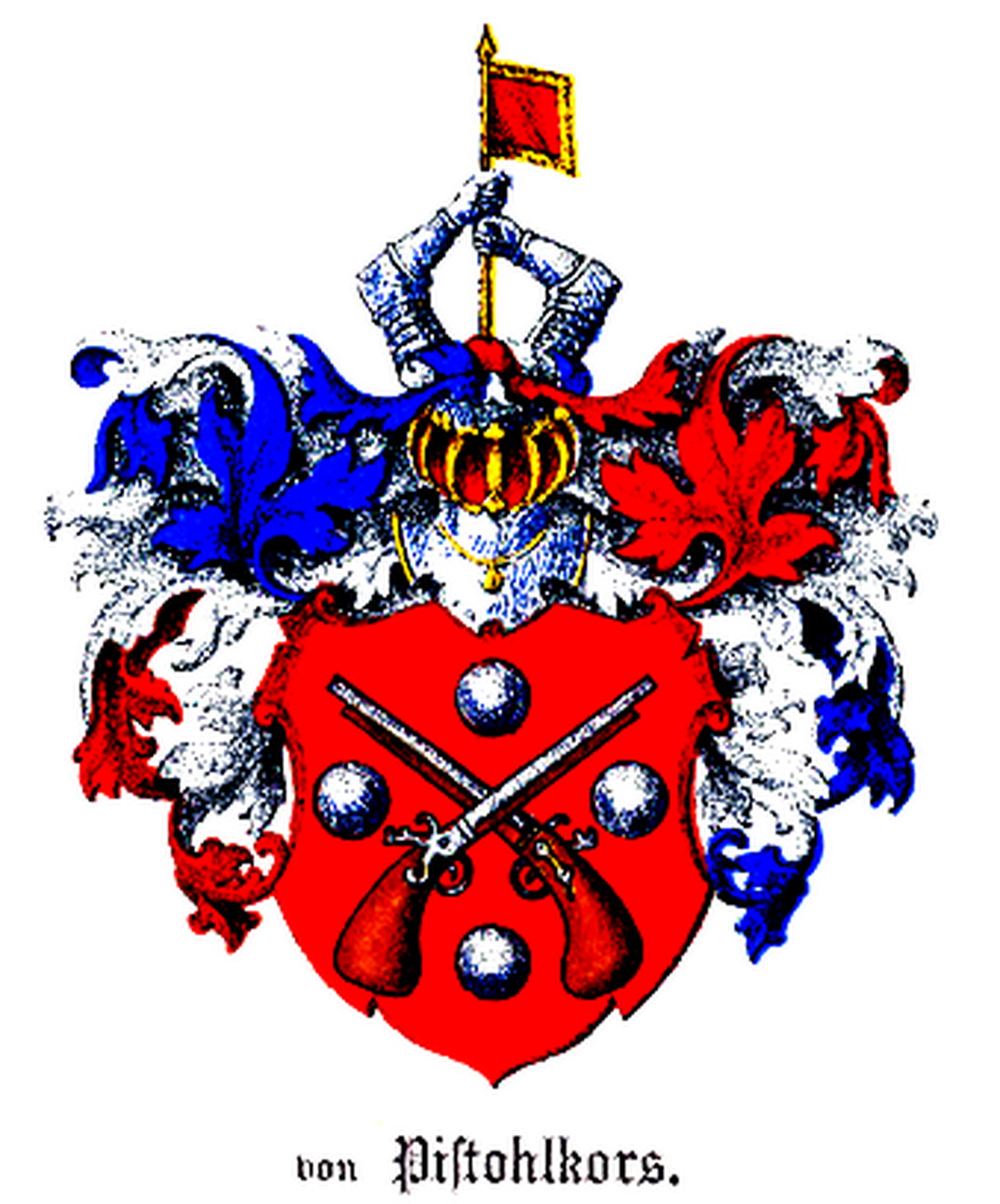
Arms of the Pistohlkors family

Alexander Erichovich von Pistohlkors (6 June 1885 in Saint Petersburg – 8 September 1941 in Brest, France) was a Russian Imperial Guard officer who was known for his cruelty in putting down the rebellion following the Russian Revolution of 1905.

== Background and connections ==
Pistohlkors was born into the Pistohlkors noble family that is of Finnish origin. He was the son of Olga Valerianovna Karnovich by her first husband, Major general Erich Gerhard Augustinovich von Pistohlkors (1853–1935), from whom she was divorced before her second marriage in 1902.

Through his mother's second marriage to Grand Duke Paul Alexandrovich of Russia, he was a stepbrother of Grand Duke Dmitri Pavlovich of Russia, one of the co-conspirators in the murder of Grigori Rasputin. His younger sister, Marianne, was also allegedly a co-conspirator in the murder.

Pistohlkors was the husband of Alexandra Taneyeva, a Rasputin follower and the sister of the Tsarina's lady in waiting, Anna Vyrubova.

== Exile ==
Pistohlkors was a minor government official under Tsar Nicholas II's rule. Grand Duchess Tatiana Nikolaevna of Russia was the godmother for his eldest daughter, Tatiana. Pistohlkors and his wife also had two younger daughters, Olga and Alexandra.

The Pistohlkors family fled to Finland in 1916 when the Russian political situation worsened, and he had estates in the Baltic countries. His daughter, Olga Ramel (1912–2011), later settled in Sweden.
