= Rudolf Heinrich Zirkwitz =

Baltic German architect

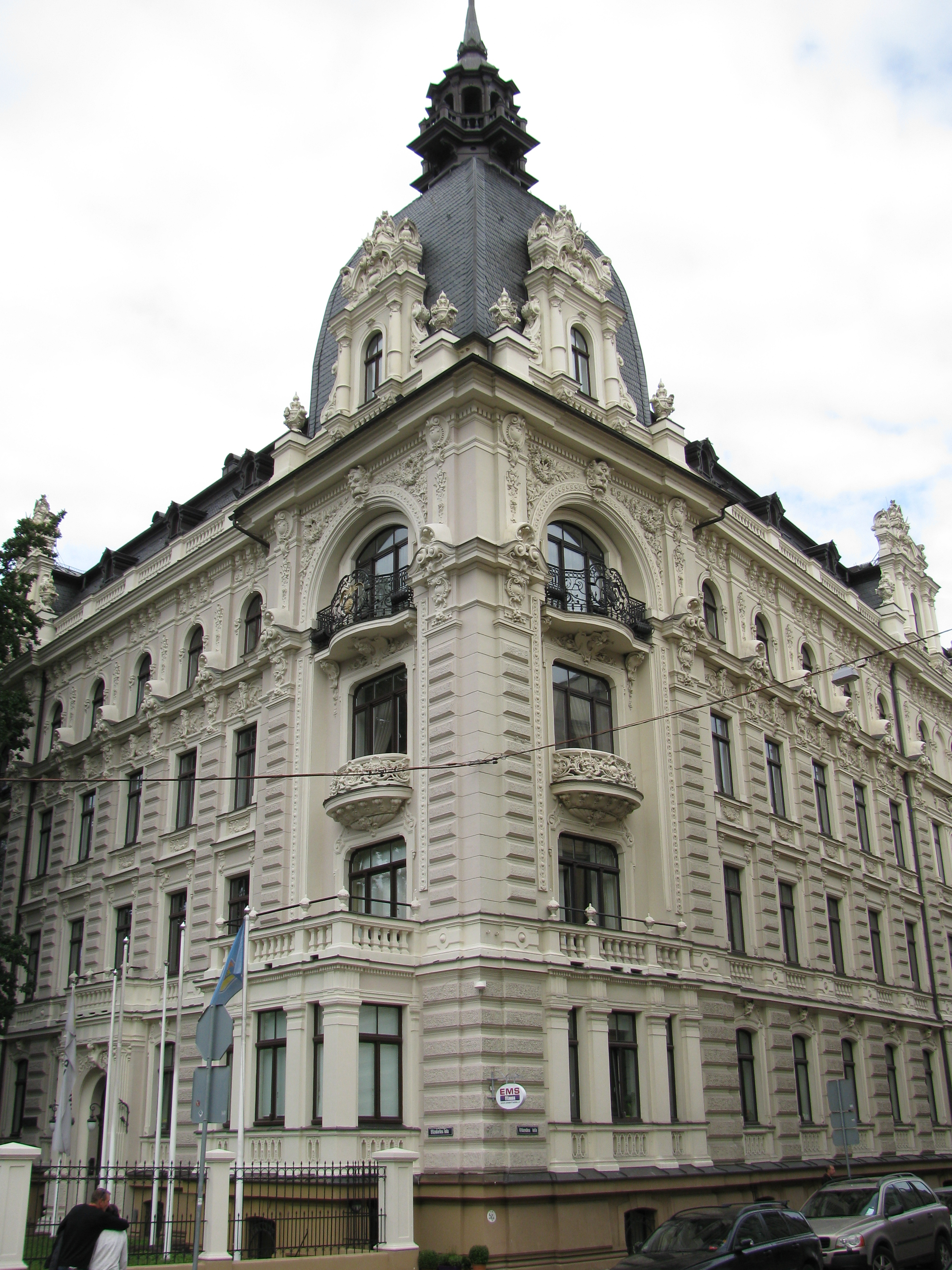
Building on Vīlandes iela 1 (Riga) designed by Zirkwitz

Rudolf Heinrich Zirkwitz (Latvian: Rūdolfs Heinrihs Cirkvics; 1857 – 1926) was a Baltic German architect working in present-day Latvia.

Rudolf Heinrich Zirkwitz studied at the Riga Polytechnic Institute (today Riga Technical University) and graduated in 1882. Apart from his work as an architect, he was also an assessor in several insurance companies worked as a building inspector at the Riga City Construction Board and taught drawing at the City Gymnasium. As an architect, he designed around 25 multi-storey apartment buildings in Riga and also supplied the plans for Igate Manor and plans for the rebuilding of Bīriņi Palace. The buildings he designed were Eclectic, with occasional influences from Art Nouveau. Many of the buildings designed by Zirkwitz in Riga were built during the heyday of Art Nouveau architecture in the city.
