= Igate Manor =

Manor in Latvia

Coordinates: 57.3800°N 24.6864°E

Igate manor
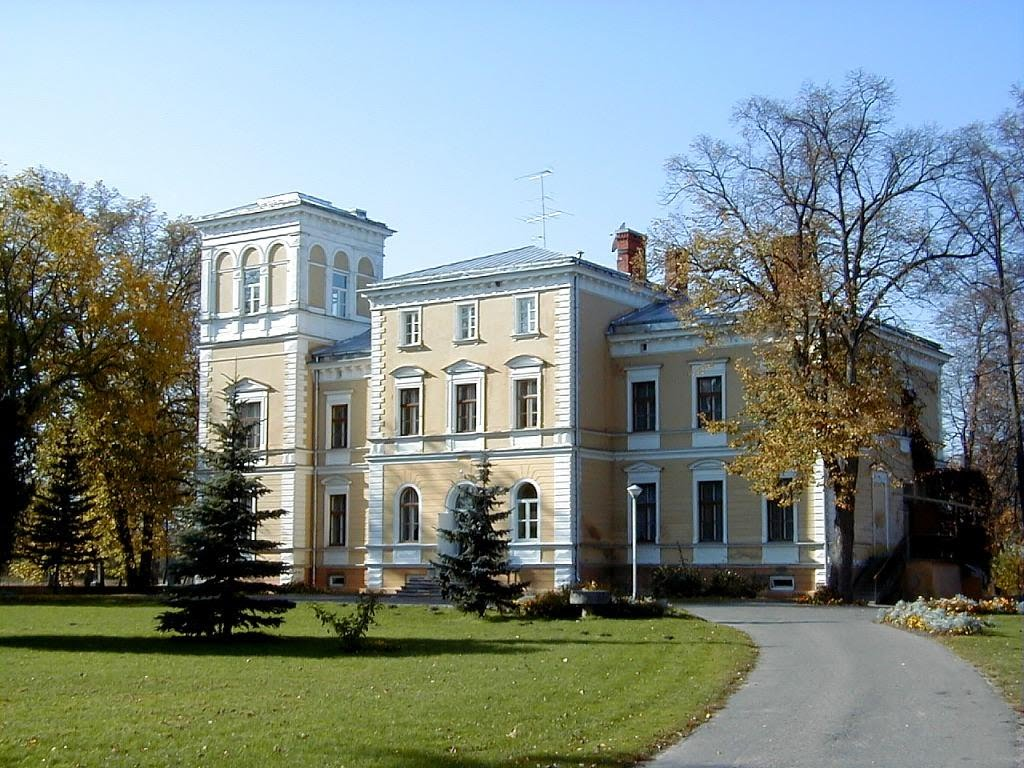
- Interactive map of the Igate manor area

General information
- Architectural style: Neo-Renaissance
- Location: Limbaži municipality, Latvia
- Completed: 1880
- Client: von Pistohlkors family

Design and construction
- Architect: Rudolf Heinrich Zirkwitz

Igate Manor (Latvian: Igates pils muiža) is a manor in the historical region of Vidzeme, in northern Latvia. It was designed by architect Rudolf Heinrich Zirkwitz. In the 1920s Igate Manor was nationalized in accordance with Latvian Land Reform of 1920.

== See also ==
- List of palaces and manor houses in Latvia
