= Alexandra Pistohlkors =

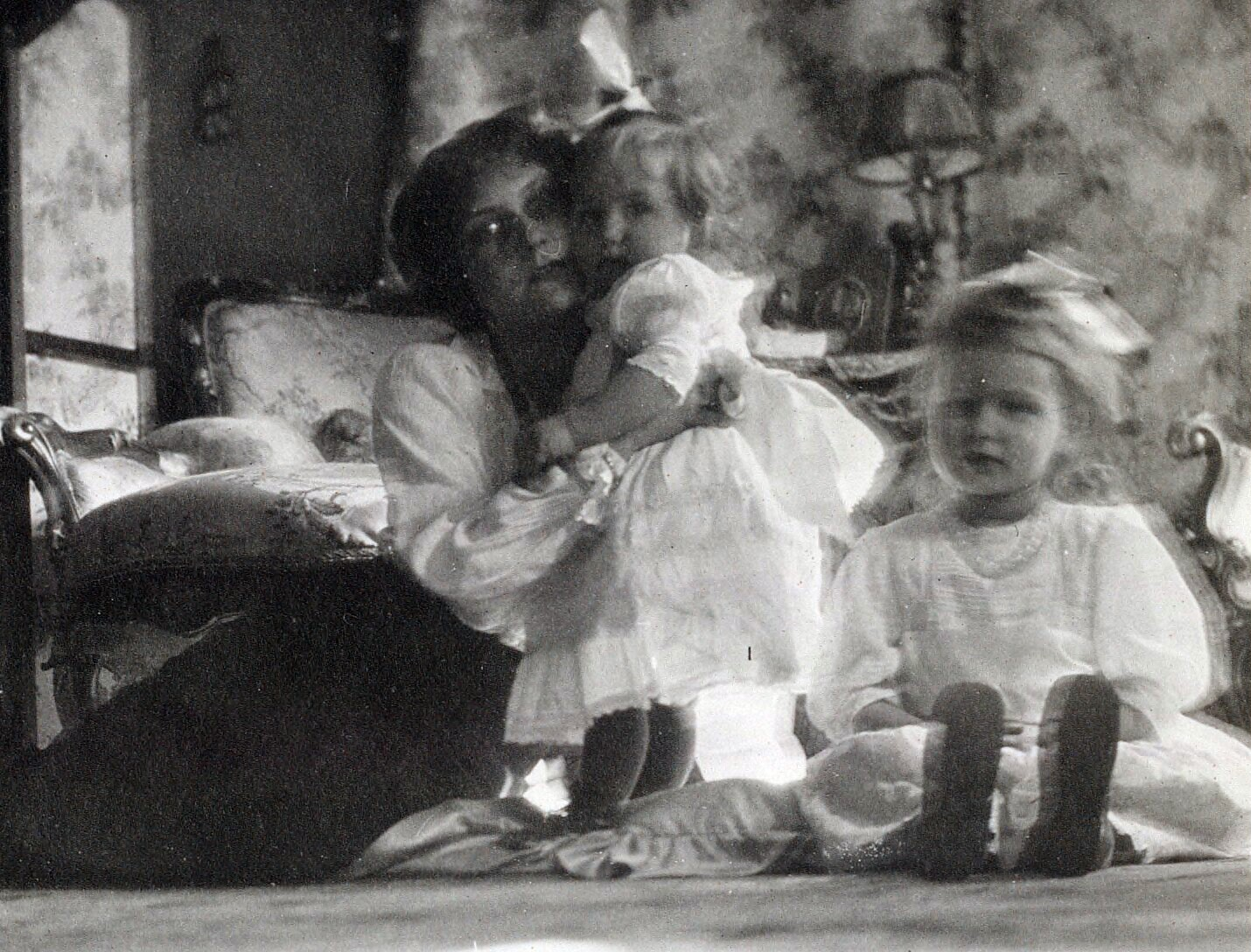
- Alexandra Pistohlkors with her daughters Olga, left, and Tatiana, right
- Born: 8 November 1888; Saint Petersburg, Russian Empire
- Died: 25 March 1963 (aged 74); Lausanne, Switzerland
- Spouse: Alexander Pistohlkors
- Parent(s): Alexander Taneyev; Nadezhda Illarionovna Tolstaya

Alexandra Alexandrovna von Pistohlkors (née Taneyeva; 8 November 1888 – 25 March 1963) was the younger daughter of noted Russian composer Alexander Taneyev and the sister of Anna Vyrubova. Her husband was Alexander Erikovich von Pistohlkors, who was the stepson of Grand Duke Paul Alexandrovich of Russia. Like her sister, Alexandra was for a time a devotee of the starets Grigori Rasputin.

== Background ==
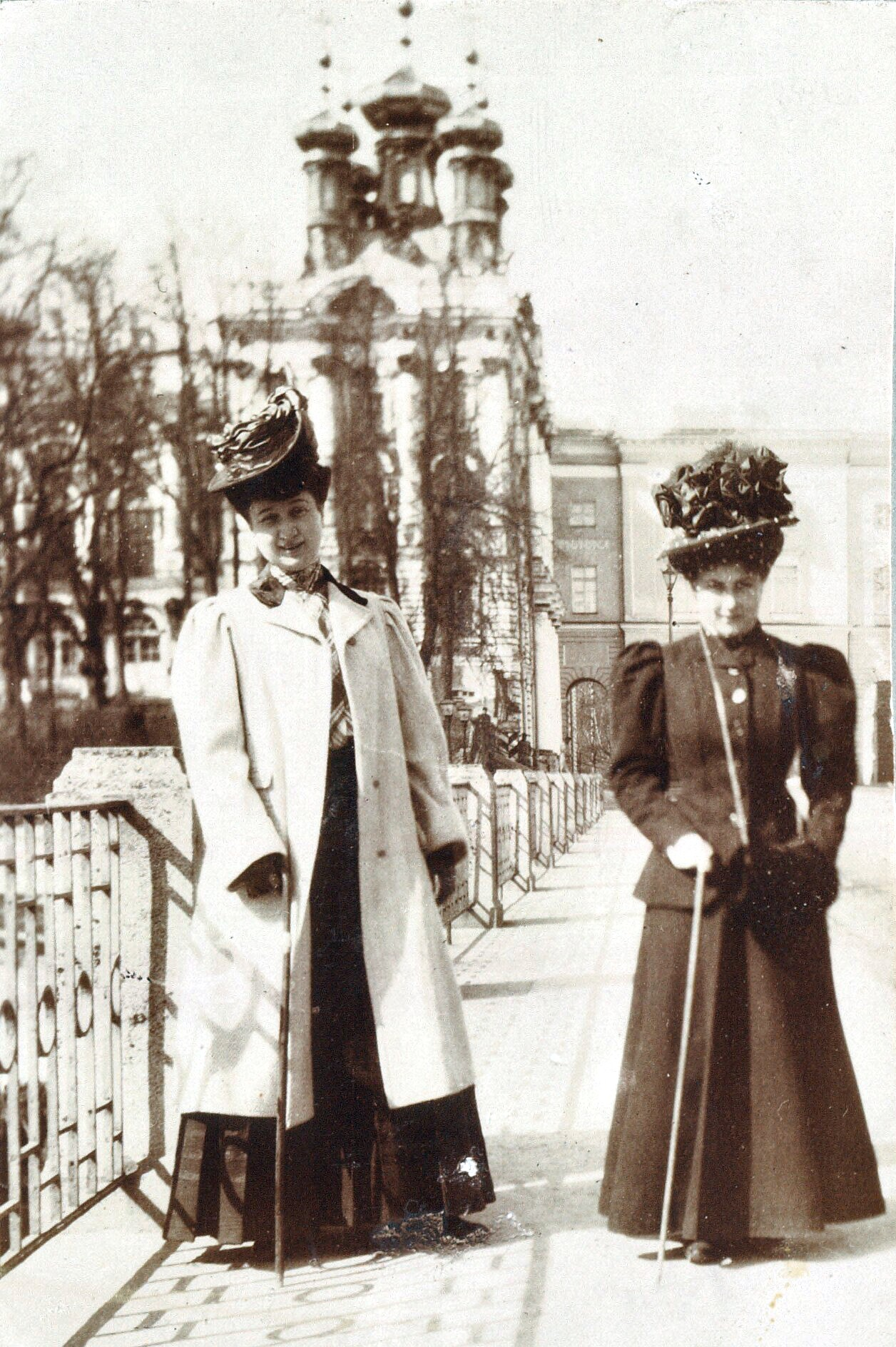
Alexandra in 1908 with her sister, Anna Vyrubova

Alexandra Taneeva was the third and youngest child of Aleksandr Taneyev, Chief Steward to His Majesty's Chancellery and a noted composer. Her mother, Countess Nadezhda Tolstoy, was descendant of Field Marshal Prince Mikhail Illarionovich Golenishchev-Kutuzov. Alexandra's nickname was Sana.

"Sana was a very nice looking woman with a little porcelain face, and she produced the charming impression of a spoiled and self-centered child," recalled the singer Alexandra Belling.

Alexandra married Alexander Pistohlkors, a former Life Guards officer who was reportedly famous for his cruelty in putting down the rebellion following the Russian Revolution of 1905. The couple had three daughters: Tatiana, Olga and Alexandra (born in 1910, 1912 and 1914). Grand Duchess Tatiana Nikolaevna of Russia was the godmother for the eldest daughter, Tatiana. Grand Duchess Olga Nikolaevna of Russia was the godmother of her middle daughter, Olga.

== Relationship with Rasputin ==
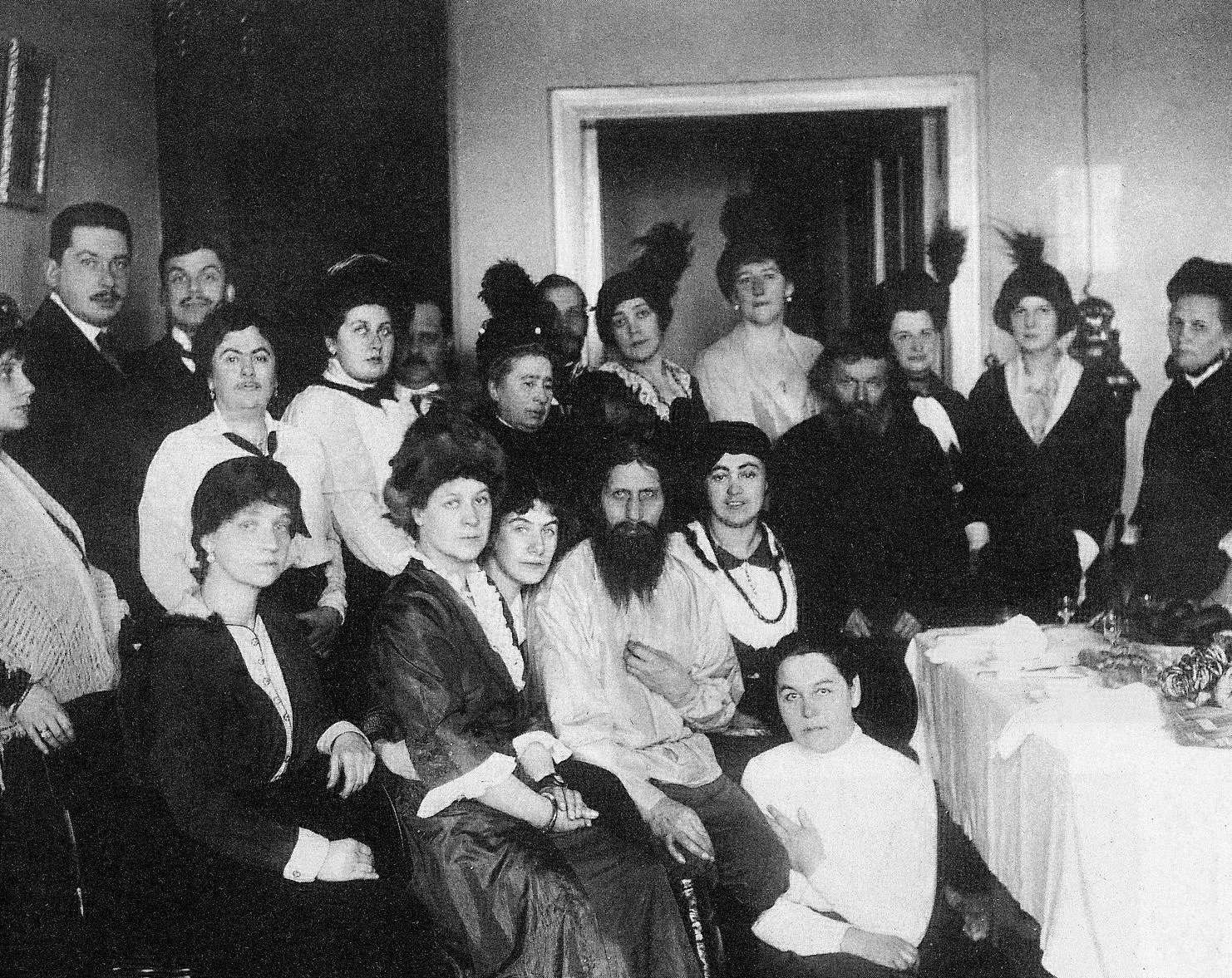
A pregnant Alexandra Pistohlkors, standing at far left, and her husband Alexander Pistohlkors, second from left, are pictured with Grigori Rasputin and other admirers in his apartment in 1914. Alexandra's sister Anna Vyrubova is in the back row, standing fourth from left.

Alexandra and her husband were featured in a widely circulated portrait of Rasputin with his admirers, which was taken in his apartment in St. Petersburg in 1914. At first, the starets was a frequent visitor to the Pistohlkors in their home, and Alexandra introduced Rasputin to many of her friends and relatives. Later, because Alexandra's mother-in-law, Olga, detested Rasputin, the young couple had to meet with Rasputin in her sister Anna's house, though Alexandra was a frequent visitor to Rasputin's apartment without her husband.

Alexandra was one of several society women who became followers of Rasputin. She also sent him telegrams, asking for his prayers or help. Rasputin persuaded some of his female followers "that they must not confess the sin of adultery, since that would only confuse their confessors, who would not understand it."

"I am very sick. I implore you to help. Sana," Alexandra wrote in a telegram to Rasputin in 1913. In another telegram, sent in April 1916, she wrote that she was "gloomily sick at heart" and "I beg for help."

Alexandra's sister-in-law, Marianne Pistohlkors, has been implicated by some historians as one of the co-conspirators in the murder of Rasputin in December 1916.

== Life following the Revolution ==
Alarmed by the worsening political situation, Alexandra and Alexander Pistohlkors fled Russia, traveling through Finland, and Sweden until making it to Paris in 1916, in order to meet up with relatives. Alexandra and family lived in Switzerland and the South of France the following years, before finally settling in Stockholm. The Pistohlkors family had Baltic estates, among them a castle in Latvia, where they lived following the Russian Revolution. Alexandra's sister, Anna Vyrubova, also later moved to Finland, where she became a nun after the Revolution.

Their daughter, Olga Ramel (1912-2011), later settled in Sweden.

== Ancestors ==
Ancestors of Alexandra Pistohlkors

8. Alexander Sergeyevich Taneyev
4. Sergei Alexandrovich Taneyev
9. Maria Vasilievna Khanykova
2. Alexander Sergeyevich Taneyev
10. Vasili Alexandrovich Bibikov
5. Anna Vasilievna Bibikova
11. Varvara Mikhailovna Simanskaya
1. Alexandra Alexandrovna Taneyeva
12. Count Nikolai Matveevich Tolstoy
6. Count Illarion Nikolaevich Tolstoy
13. Ekaterina Alexeievna Khitrova
3. Countess Nadezhda Illarionovna Tolstaya
14. Prince Alexander Feodorovich Golitsyn
7. Princess Alexandra Alexandrovna Golitsyna
15. Countess Nadezhda Ivanovna Kutaisova
