= Vyrubov =

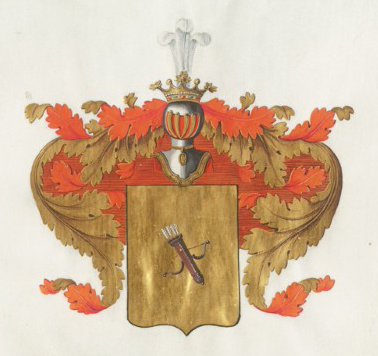
Coat of Arms of the Vyrubov family

The Vyrubov family (Russian: Вырубов) is an old Russian noble family of Boyars.

== History ==
The name originated from the word vyrub, a space in a forest cleared from trees, which used to be a common dwelling place in the past.

== Notable members ==
- Anna Vyrubova (1884–1964), lady in waiting and confidante of Russian Empress Alexandra Fyodorovna
- Grigory Vyrubov (1843–1913), Russian philosopher and historian of science
