= Taneyevka =

Taneyevka Танеевка
- Selo
- Location within Bashkortostan Location within Russia
- Coordinates: 53°43′N 56°02′E
- Country: Russia
- Region: Bashkortostan
- District: Sterlitamaksky District
- Time zone: UTC+5:00

Taneyevka (Russian: Танеевка) is a rural locality (a selo) in Krasnoyarsky Selsoviet, Sterlitamaksky District, Bashkortostan, Russia. The population was 121 as of 2010. There are 3 streets.

== Geography ==
Taneyevka is located 17 km northeast of Sterlitamak (the district's administrative centre) by road. Novy Krasnoyar is the nearest rural locality.
