= Taneyevka, Kursk Oblast =

Rural locality in Kursk Oblast, Russia

Taneyevka Танеевка
- Khutor
- Interactive map of Taneyevka
- Location of Taneyevka Taneyevka (Kursk Oblast)
- Coordinates: 51°21′45″N 36°06′47″E
- Country: Russia
- Federal subject: Kursk Oblast
- Administrative district: Medvensky District
- SelsovietSelsoviet: Nizhnereutchansky

Population (2010 Census)
  - Total: 54
  - Estimate (2010): 54 (0%)

Municipal status
  - Municipal district: Medvensky Municipal District
  - Rural settlement: Nizhnereutchansky Selsoviet Rural Settlement
- Time zone: UTC+3 (MSK)
- Postal code: 307030
- Dialing code: +7 47146
- OKTMO ID: 38624436166
- Website: nizhnezeut.rkursk.ru

Taneyevka (Russian: Танеевка) is a rural locality (a khutor) in Nizhnereutchansky Selsoviet Rural Settlement, Medvensky District, Kursk Oblast, Russia. Population: 54 (2010 census); 108 (2002 census);

== Geography ==
The khutor is located on the Reut River (a left tributary of the Seym), 61 km from the Russia–Ukraine border, 39 km south of Kursk, 5.5 km south of the district center – the urban-type settlement Medvenka, 5 km from the selsoviet center – Nizhny Reutets.

Climate

Taneyevka has a warm-summer humid continental climate (Dfb in the Köppen climate classification).

== Transport ==
Taneyevka is located 2.5 km from the federal route M-2 Crimea Highway (a part of the European route E105), 32 km from the nearest railway halt 457 km (railway line Lgov I — Kursk).

The rural locality is situated 45 km from Kursk Vostochny Airport, 85 km from Belgorod International Airport and 222 km from Voronezh Peter the Great Airport.
