= Anna Vyrubova =

Russian lady-in-waiting (1884–1964)

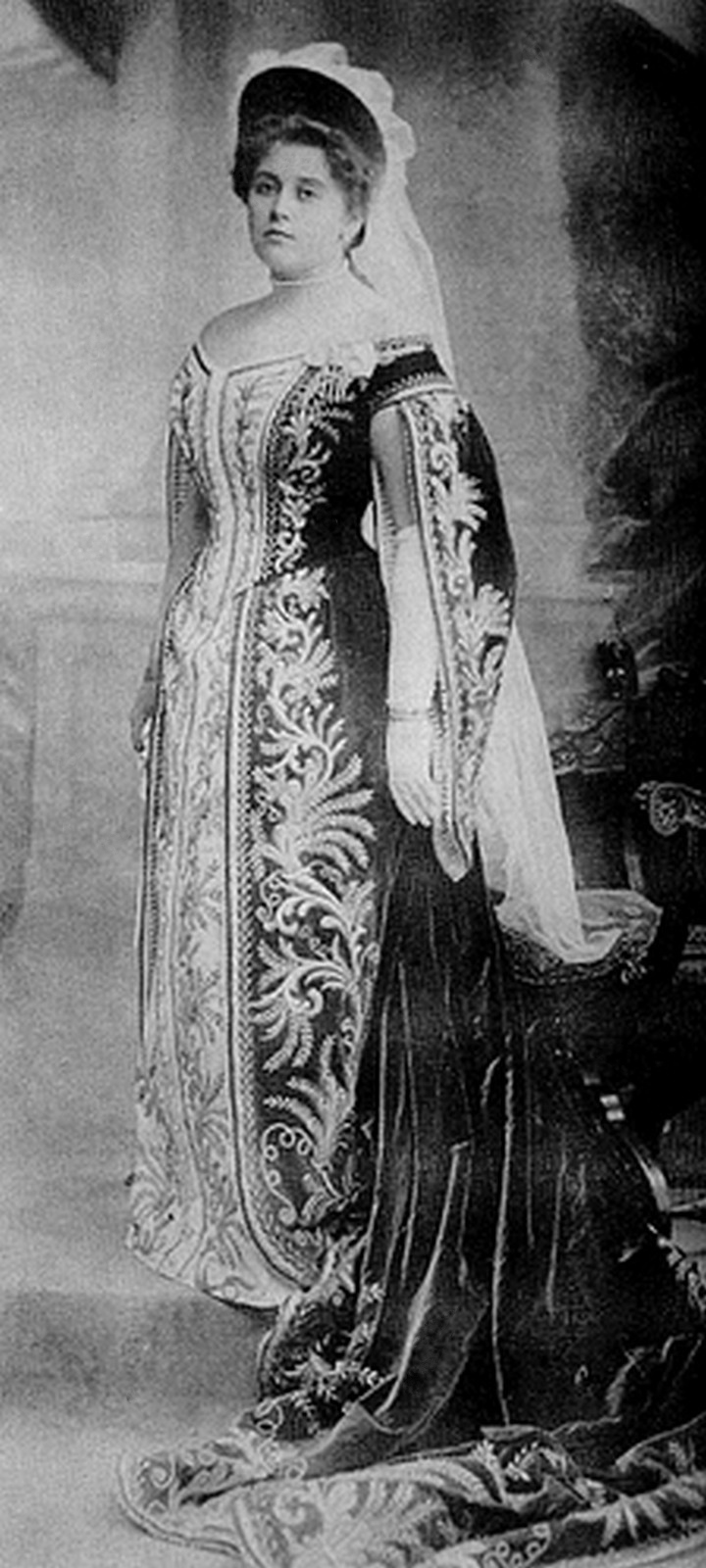
- Anna Alexandrovna Vyrubova
- Born: 16 July 1884; Oranienbaum, Russia
- Died: 20 July 1964 (aged 80); Helsinki, Finland
- Parents: Aleksandr Taneyev (father); Countess Nadezhda Tolstoy (mother)
- Relatives: Alexandra Pistohlkors (sister)

Anna Alexandrovna Vyrubova (Russian: А́нна Алекса́ндровна Вы́рубова; née Taneyeva [Тане́ева]; 16 July 1884 – 20 July 1964) was a Russian lady-in-waiting. She was the best friend and confidante of Empress Alexandra Fyodorovna.

== Early life ==
Anna Alexandrovna Taneyeva was born in Oranienbaum as the daughter of Aleksandr Taneyev, Chief Steward to His Majesty's Chancellery and a noted composer. Her mother, Countess Nadezhda Tolstoy (1860–1937), descended from Field Marshal Mikhail Golenishchev-Kutuzov, Prince of Smolensk. These connections allowed her to become attached to the imperial court at an early age. She had two younger siblings: Sergei and Alexandra.

She was a childhood friend of Felix Yusupov, who later spearheaded the murder of Rasputin. Yusupov found her unattractive:

Anna the eldest Taneev girl, was tall and stout with a puffy, shiny face, and no charm whatsoever. Although she was not at all intelligent, she was extremely crafty and rather sly. It was quite a problem to find partners for her. No one could have foreseen that this unattractive girl would one day become the intimate friend and evil genius of the Tsarina. It was largely due to her that Rasputin owed his amazing rise to favour.

== Life at court ==
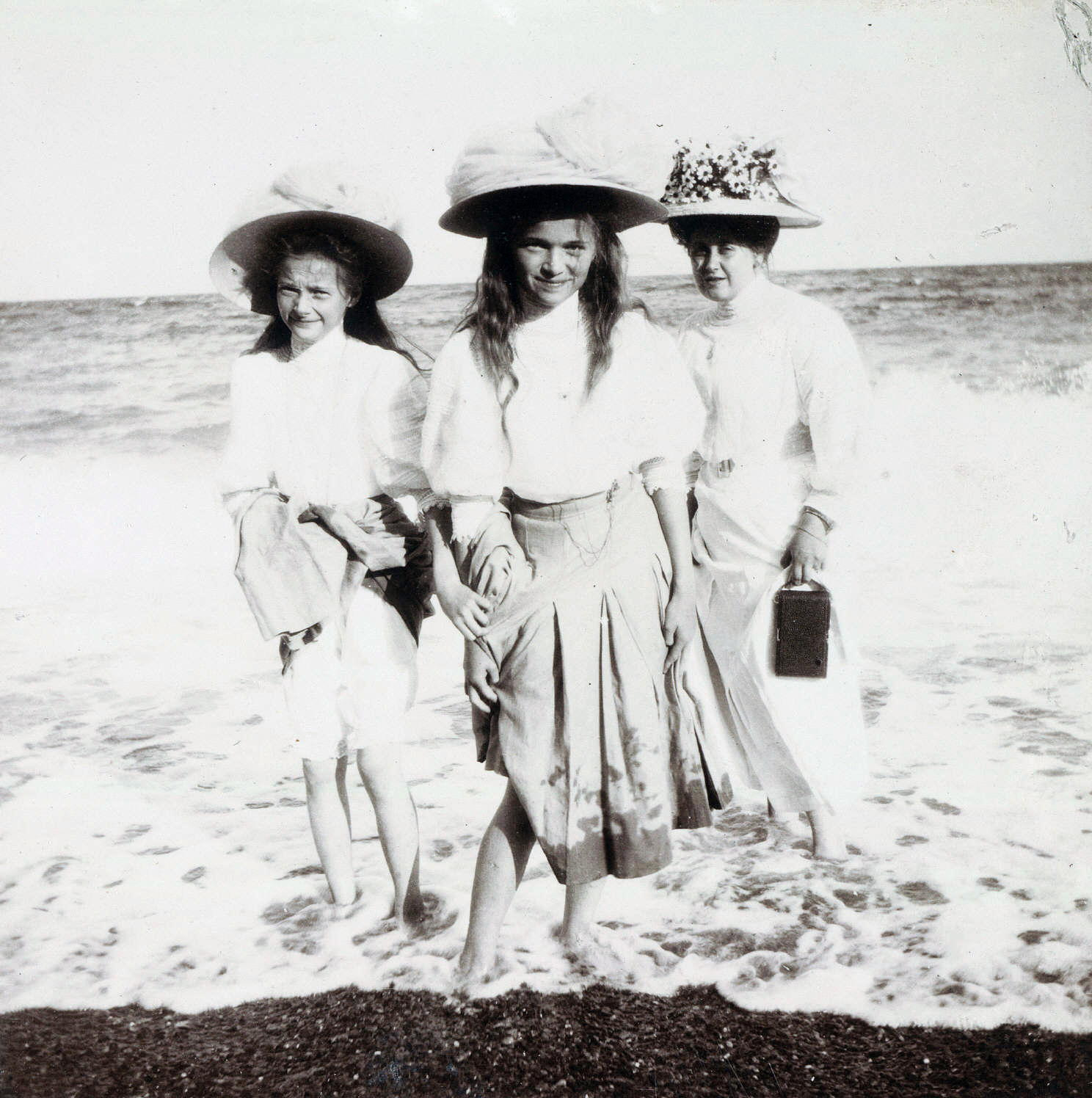
Anna Vyrubova wading at the beach with Grand Duchesses Tatiana, left, and Olga Nikolaevna of Russia. Courtesy: Beinecke Library.

The Tsarina valued Anna's devotion to her and befriended her, ignoring women of more distinction at the court. In 1905, at the age of twenty, she was given a position at court for the first time. She went on holidays with the Romanovs in three succeeding years. In 1907, Anna married Alexander Vasilievich Vyrubov (1880–1919), a Russian nobleman and an officer appointed in the Imperial chancellery. A few days before, she was warned by Rasputin that the marriage would be an unhappy one. According to Vyrubova, her husband was mad and went for treatment in Switzerland. The couple divorced within a year and a half. It is said that her husband was upset after he found out she had contacted Rasputin. In her memoirs, Rasputin's daughter Maria claimed that Vyrubova was raped on her wedding night and that Vyrubov "pounced upon her as one would another man in a bathroom brawl and proceeded to beat her as he shouted all sorts of obscenities, most of which she didn't understand." Vyrubova's mother reportedly told interrogators following the February Revolution that her son-in-law "proved to be completely impotent, with an extremely perverse sexual psychology that manifested itself in various sadistic episodes in which he inflicted moral suffering on her and evoked a feeling of utter disgust."

Vyrubova became one of Rasputin's adherents and on the order of the Tsarina, she went on a trip to his home village of Pokrovskoye to investigate the rumours about Rasputin. She visited some monasteries in the area. Vyrubova's importance grew at the court, as the friendship with Milica of Montenegro and her sister Anastasia deteriorated. "With the death of Father John of Kronstadt, "Father" Grigori became, in her eyes, the only mediator with God, the only man with effective prayers. He was called to replace Father John." In 1909 she received hieromonk Iliodor in her house for a meeting with the Tsar. Around Easter 1912 Vyrubova stashed Rasputin on a train to Yalta, so he could visit the Imperial family in the Livadia Palace on the Crimea.

=== Rasputin ===
In early October 1912, during a grave crisis in Spała, in Russian Poland, the Tsarevich Alexei received the last sacrament. The desperate Tsarina turned to Vyrubova to secure the help of the peasant healer, who at that time was out of favor. (The basis for the denunciation of Rasputin as a Khlyst was his participation in mixed bathing, a perfectly usual custom among the peasants of many parts of Siberia.)

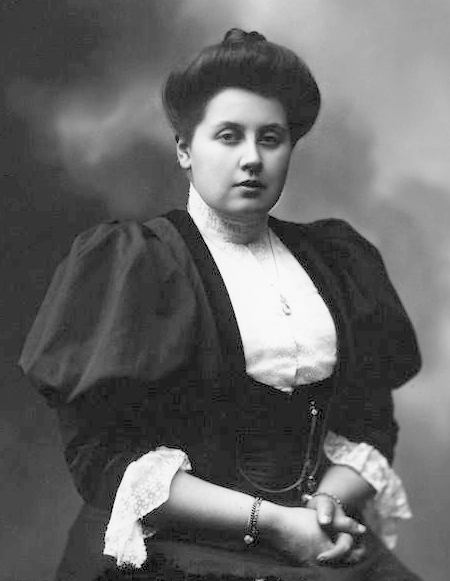
For Pierre Gilliard and Alexander Spiridovich, Vyrubova had been ignorant and devoid of common sense when she entered the court. The latter said she openly became Rasputin's "fanatical admirer, the driving force of his cult, and was at the head of his loyalists."

For a long time, she served as a go-between for the Tsarina and Rasputin. In the Summer of 1914, Vyrubova received a cable from Rasputin, recovering from the attack by Khioniya Guseva in a Tyumen hospital. She had to show it directly to the Tsar Nicholas II. Rasputin was fearful of the consequences of war with Germany. Nicholas had been furious, but Anna arranged a reunion. While seldom meeting with Alexandra personally after the debate in the Imperial Duma, Rasputin had become her personal adviser after the Tsar took supreme command of the Russian armies in the field on 23 August 1915 (O.S.), hoping this would lift morale. All contacts between the Tsarina and Rasputin went through Vyrubova; every morning at ten she phoned Rasputin and he came to visit her lemon-yellow house in Tsarskoye Selo to meet Alexandra. The Tsar's biggest concern was that Alexandra might share information with others.

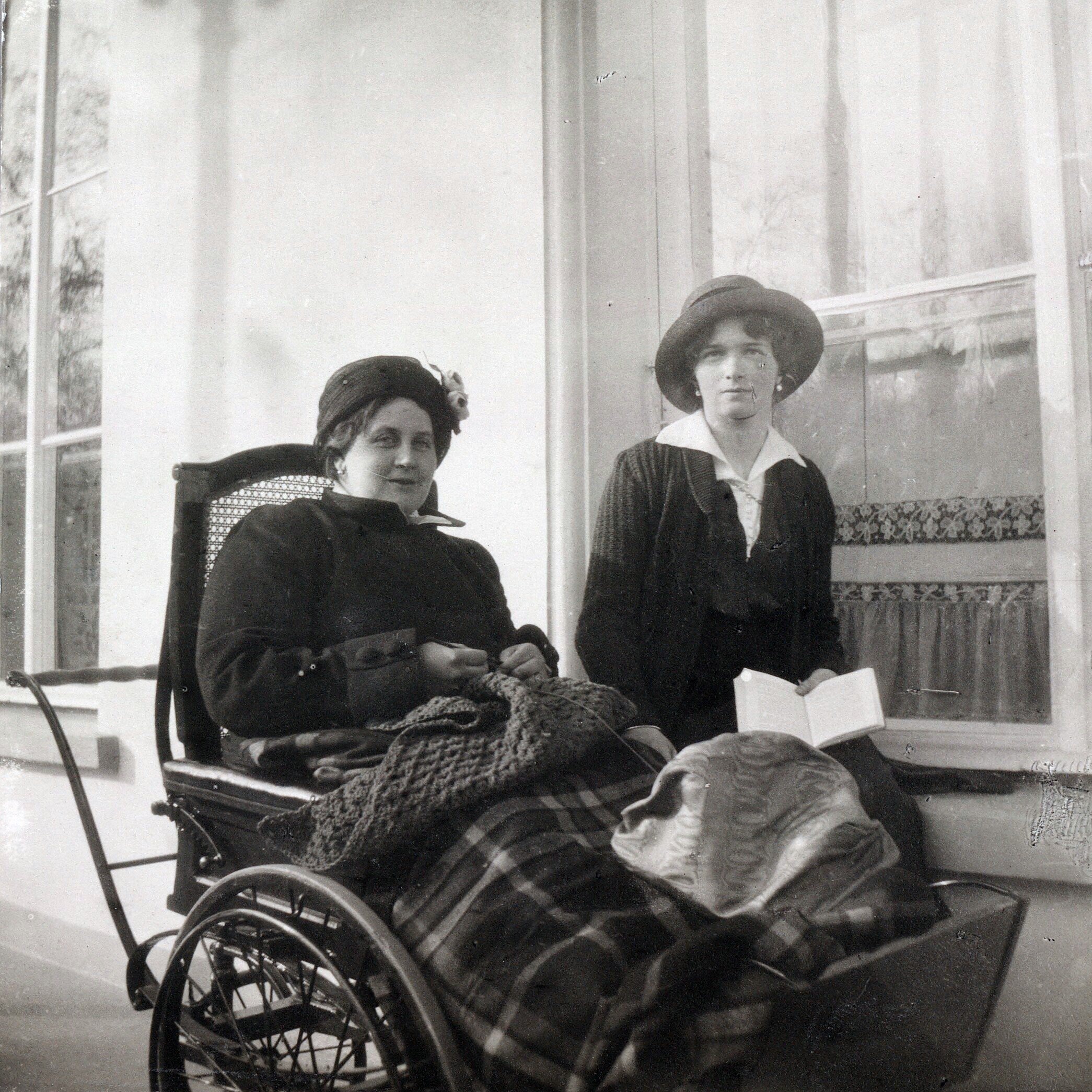
Anna Vyrubova with Grand Duchess Olga Nikolaevna in 1916. Courtesy: Beinecke Library.

During World War I, she trained as a Red Cross nurse and nursed soldiers along with the Tsarina and the Tsarina's two older daughters, the grand duchesses Olga and Tatiana. Vyrubova was severely injured in a train accident between the capital and Tsarskoye Selo in January 1915; the convalescent Vyrubova found herself a paraplegic, but credited Rasputin with saving her life with his prayers. In September 1916 she, Lili Dehn and Rasputin went to Tobolsk to pay tribute to John of Tobolsk, who had been glorified.

Vyrubova started a hospital with the money she received from the train company as compensation. Protopopov came to visit the hospital almost every day. She also planned to build a church dedicated to Seraphim of Sarov on her property. (Rasputin would be buried on the spot.) On Friday evening 16 December 1916 Rasputin told Vyrubova, who presented him a small icon, signed and dated at the back by the Tsarina and her daughters, of a proposed midnight visit to Prince Yusupov in his Moika Palace to meet his wife. The next morning Rasputin's disappearance was reported by his daughter to Vyrubova. When Vyrubova spoke of it to the Empress, Alexandra pointed out that Irina Aleksandrovna Romanova was absent from Petrograd. An investigation followed and Prince Yusupov and Grand Duke Dmitri were placed under house arrest in the Sergei Palace. The Tsarina had refused to meet the two but was told by Anna they could explain what had happened in a letter. Two days later Rasputin's body was found near Bolshoy Petrovsky Bridge. His body was taken to the Chesmensky Almshouse for autopsy. In the middle of the night, Vyrubova and the Tsarina brought some clothes to the almshouse. On 21 December Rasputin's body was taken in a zinc coffin from the Chesme Church to be buried in a secret location in a corner on the property of Vyrubova adjacent to the palace. The burial was attended by the Imperial couple with their daughters – the tsesarevich was too ill, Vyrubova, her maid, and a few of Rasputin's friends, as Colonel Loman and Lili Dehn. It is unclear if Maria Rasputin was there. On 11 March 1917, following the February Revolution, the coffin with Rasputin was dug up and transported to Saint Petersburg State Polytechnical University, and cremated in the cauldrons of the nearby boiler shop, without leaving a single trace.

== Later life ==
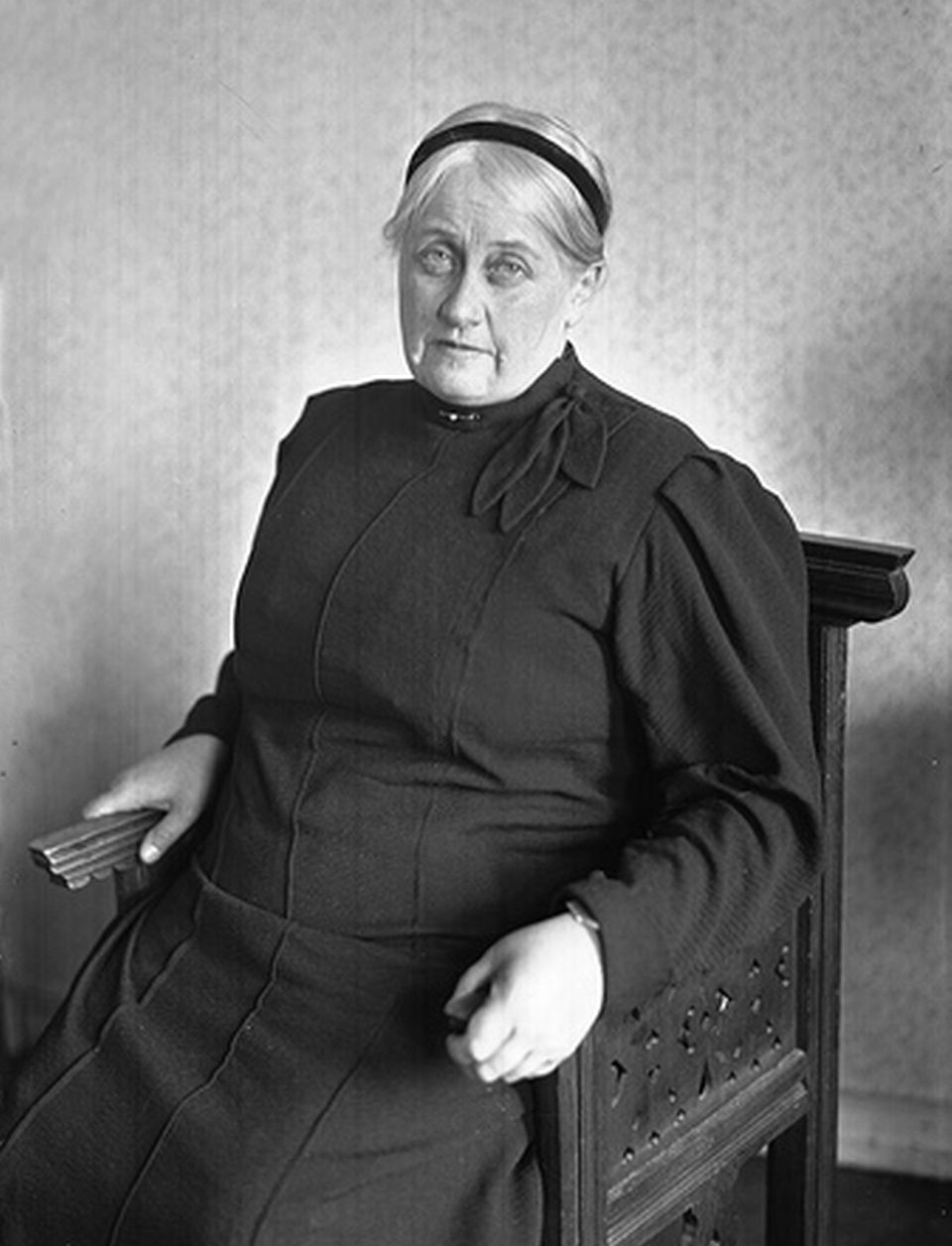
Anna Vyrubova in Helsinki in 1957

Sick with measles, Anna Vyrubova was arrested on 21 March 1917 and underwent five months of prison in the Peter and Paul Fortress, which included a medical examination to prove her virginity. The interrogation on her political role started on 6 May. Vyrubova admitted she saw Rasputin once or twice a week but feigned a childish innocence. The investigator concluded that she was too naïve and unintelligent to have had any influence over the Tsarina.

In Anna's own memoirs, she describes her perils in prison and her narrow escape from execution when, miraculously, she met several old friends of her father on a St. Petersburg street who helped her escape. She endured much hardship avoiding the Bolsheviks, and she was able to escape to Finland only in December 1920. Before leaving Russia, she became friends with the revolutionary writer Maxim Gorky, who urged her to write her memoirs; she followed his advice. She met with Zinaida Gippius, Alexander Blok and Valery Bryusov. Her memories of life at court provided rare descriptions of the home life of the Tsar and his family.

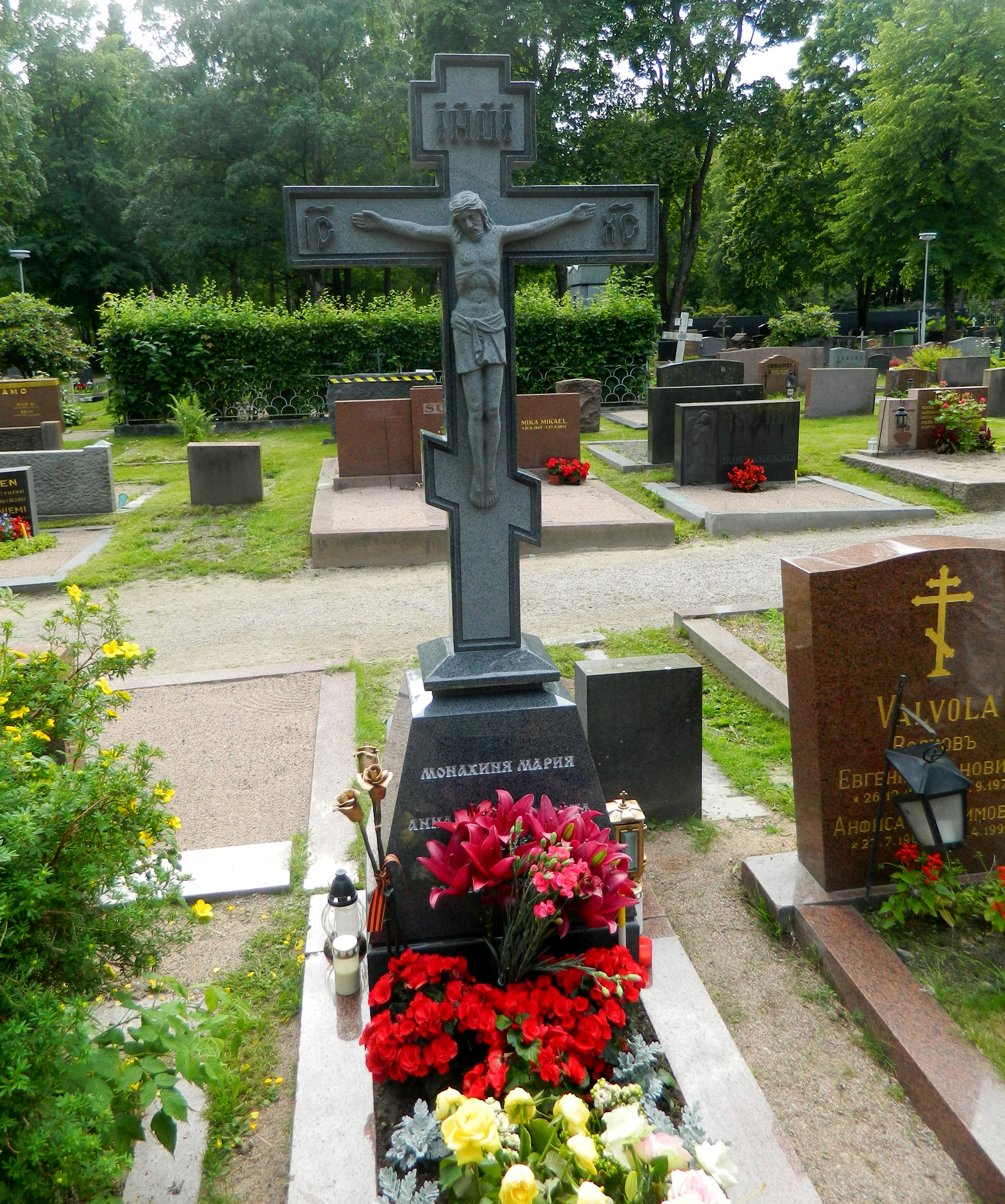
Anna Vyrubova's grave at the Hietaniemi Orthodox Cemetery in Helsinki

Vyrubova spent the rest of her life first in Viipuri and later in Helsinki. She took vows as a Russian Orthodox nun but was permitted to live in a private home because of her physical disabilities. On 20 July 1964, she died at the age of 80, in Helsinki, where she was buried in the Orthodox section of Hietaniemi cemetery.

== Sources ==
- Fuhrmann, Joseph T. (2013). Rasputin, the untold story (illustrated ed.). Hoboken, New Jersey: John Wiley & Sons, Inc. p. 314. ISBN 978-1-118-17276-6.
- Maylunas, Andrei, and Mironenko, Sergei, eds.; Galy, Darya, translator, A Lifelong Passion: Nicholas and Alexandra: Their Own Story, Doubleday, 1997 ISBN 0-385-48673-1
- Nelipa, Margarita (2010) The Murder of Grigorii Rasputin. A Conspiracy That Brought Down the Russian Empire, Gilbert's Books. ISBN 978-0-9865310-1-9.
- Radzinsky, Edvard (2000) The Rasputin File, Doubleday. ISBN 0-385-48909-9
- Vyrubova, Anna (1923) Memories of the Russian Court
- Virubova, Anna Taneleff & Irmeli Viherjuuri, Anna Virubova: Keisarinnan Hovineiti. Otava, 1987. ISBN 951-1-09357-6.
- Gilliard, Pierre (1921), Thirteen Years at the Russian Court. Ch. 13: "Tsar at the Duma – Galacia – Life at G.Q.H. – Growing Disaffection".
