= Alexander Spiridovich =

General in the Russian Imperial Guard (1873–1952)

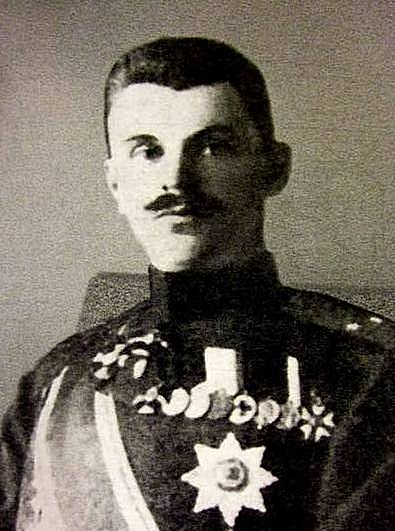
Alexander Spiridovich

Alexander Ivanovich Spiridovich (Russian: Алекса́ндр Ива́нович Спиридо́вич; August 17, 1873 – June 30, 1952) was a police general in the Russian Imperial Guard. He became a historian after he had left Russia.

== Life ==
Spiridovitch was born in Arkhangelsk. In 1893 he graduated from military academy and was promoted to sub-Lieutenant of the 105th Orenburg regiment garrison in Vilna.

In 1899 he joined Special Corps of Gendarmes and started to work in Okhrana in Moscow. In 1902 he was named Chief of the Kiev Section of the Okhrana. At that time, Kiev was a principal center of activity for the Socialist-Revolutionary Party. Spiridovitch and his men were highly recognized for their counter-terrorist work, and at the young age of 29, was promoted to lieutenant colonel. In May 1905, Spiridovich was shot twice at close range in the streets of Kiev by a pistol fired by the Bolshevik Peter Rudnenko (who had been Spiridovich's own informer within the revolutionary circles). He was forced by his injuries to take a leave of absence from service and rest until the winter of 1905.

In 1906 Spiridovitch was appointed the head of Nicholas II's secret personal guard, the post he occupied for ten years. After the assassination of the Prime Minister Pyotr Stolypin in Kiev, Spiridovich was investigated for failure to take necessary measures to guard Stolypin, but no charges were brought, and he retained his position.

During the First World War, Spiridovich accompanied Nicholas II on his trips between Tsarskoe Selo, the military headquarters in Baranovichi and Mogilev, and many military formations on the front. In 1915, he was awarded the rank of major general. In August 1916 Spiridovich was appointed mayor of Yalta.

After the February Revolution Spiridovitch, who was visiting Saint Petersburg, was arrested – as one of the first – on personal order of Alexander Kerensky. On October 2, he was released from the Peter and Paul fortress by accident, and managed to leave Russia. He and his second wife and children re-settled in Paris in 1920.

== Works ==
=== Russian language ===
- Революционное движение в России:Российская Социал-Демократическая Рабочая Партия: "Revolutionary movement in Russia: Russian Social Democratic Labour Party", 1914
- Революционное движение в России:Партия Социалистов-Революционеров и ее предшественники: "Revolutionary movement in Russia: Socialist-Revolutionary Party", 1916
- Записки жандарма. "Memoirs of gendarme", 1928
- Великая Война и Февральская Революция 1914-1917 "Great war and February Revolution". Published in 1962.

=== French language ===
- Les Dernières années de la Cour de Tsarskoe Selo, Payot, Paris 1928.
- Histoire du terrorisme russe, 1886-1917. Paris, Payot, 1930
- Raspoutine 1863-1916. 1936 — biography of Grigori Rasputin

=== English language ===
- Book 1 Les Dernières Années de la Cour de Tsarskoe Selo, English Translation by Emily Plank, ISBN 978-0-9806803-0-0 Russiahouse Press, 2009
- Book 1 God, The Tsar & Mother Russia, ISBN 978-0-9806803-2-4 Russiahouse Press, 2009

== See also ==
- Eremin letter
- Isaac Don Levine
