= Broder Knud Brodersen Wigelsen =

Danish naval officer

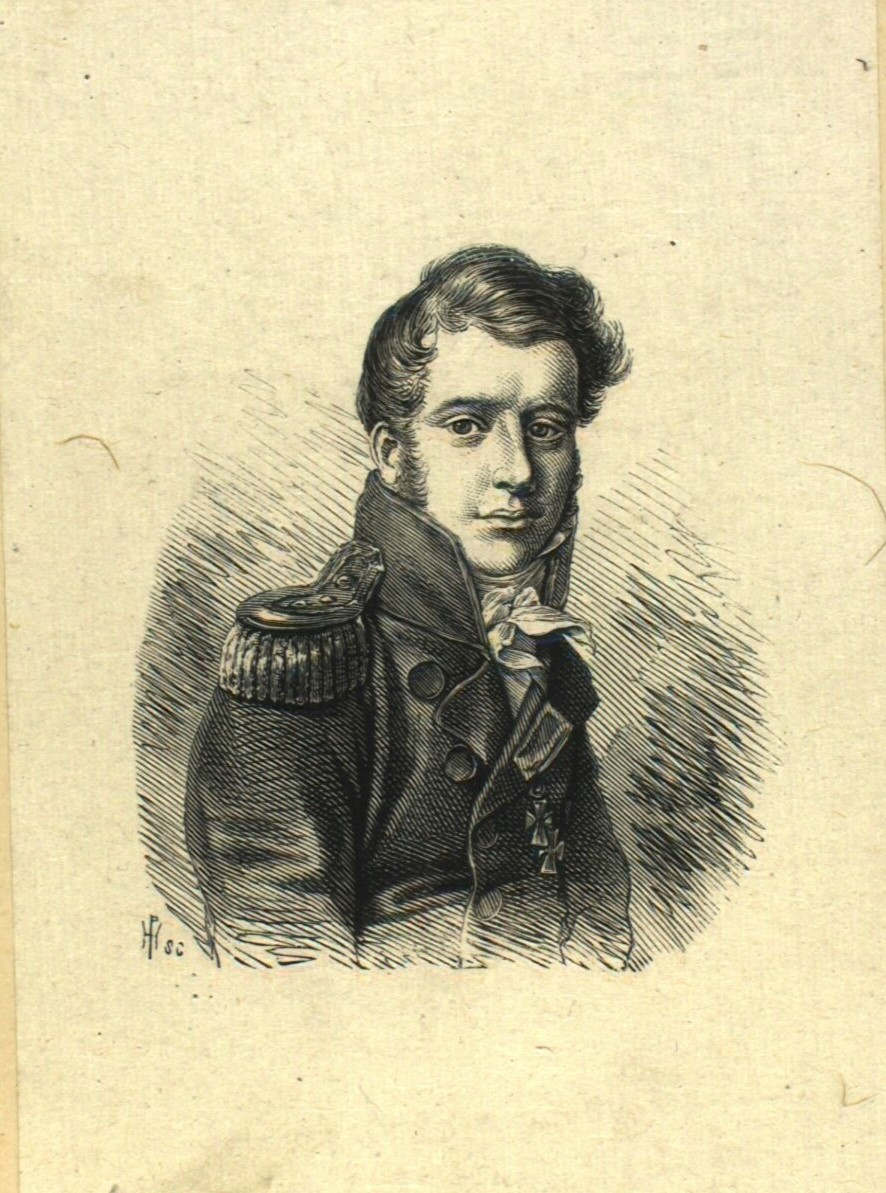
- Born: 29 June 1787; Aalborg
- Died: 10 September 1867 (aged 80); Copenhagen
- Burial place: Holmens Cemetery, Copenhagen
- Military career
- Allegiance: Denmark-Norway
- Branch: Royal Danish Navy
- Service years: 1797–1815
- Rank: Captain
- Conflicts: Gunboat War; HMS Seagull; HMS Attack

Captain Broder Knud Brodersen Wigelsen (29 June 1787 – 10 September 1867) was a Danish naval officer who served in the French Revolutionary and Napoleonic Wars. After the war he served in various capacities, principally in the Danish customs service.

== Family influences ==
Broder Knud Brodersen Wigelsen was born on 29 June 1787 in the town of Aalborg where his father, Hans Wigelsen, was a prominent merchant and also justice of the peace and mayor. His mother was Marie Elisabeth née Thygesen.
Wigelsen's father, Hans, had taken over the business of his father-in-law at "Lybækkergården", on Østerågade in 1784 renaming it "Wigelsen & sons" which became one of the leading establishments in Aalborg. Until the loss of Norway in 1814 (Treaty of Kiel) and Denmark's state bankruptcy, the firm operated its own ships, or those of its partners, trading foodstuffs, corn, soap and candles to Norway, returning to Aalborg with timber, iron and glass. With privately kitted out ships after the Danish Privateer Regulations of 1807 several British and Swedish (merchant) ships were captured.
Broder Wigelsen married in 1809, in Norway, Karen Magdalene Fangen - the daughter of an infantry captain. Of the couple's eleven children, five died in infancy.

== Naval career ==
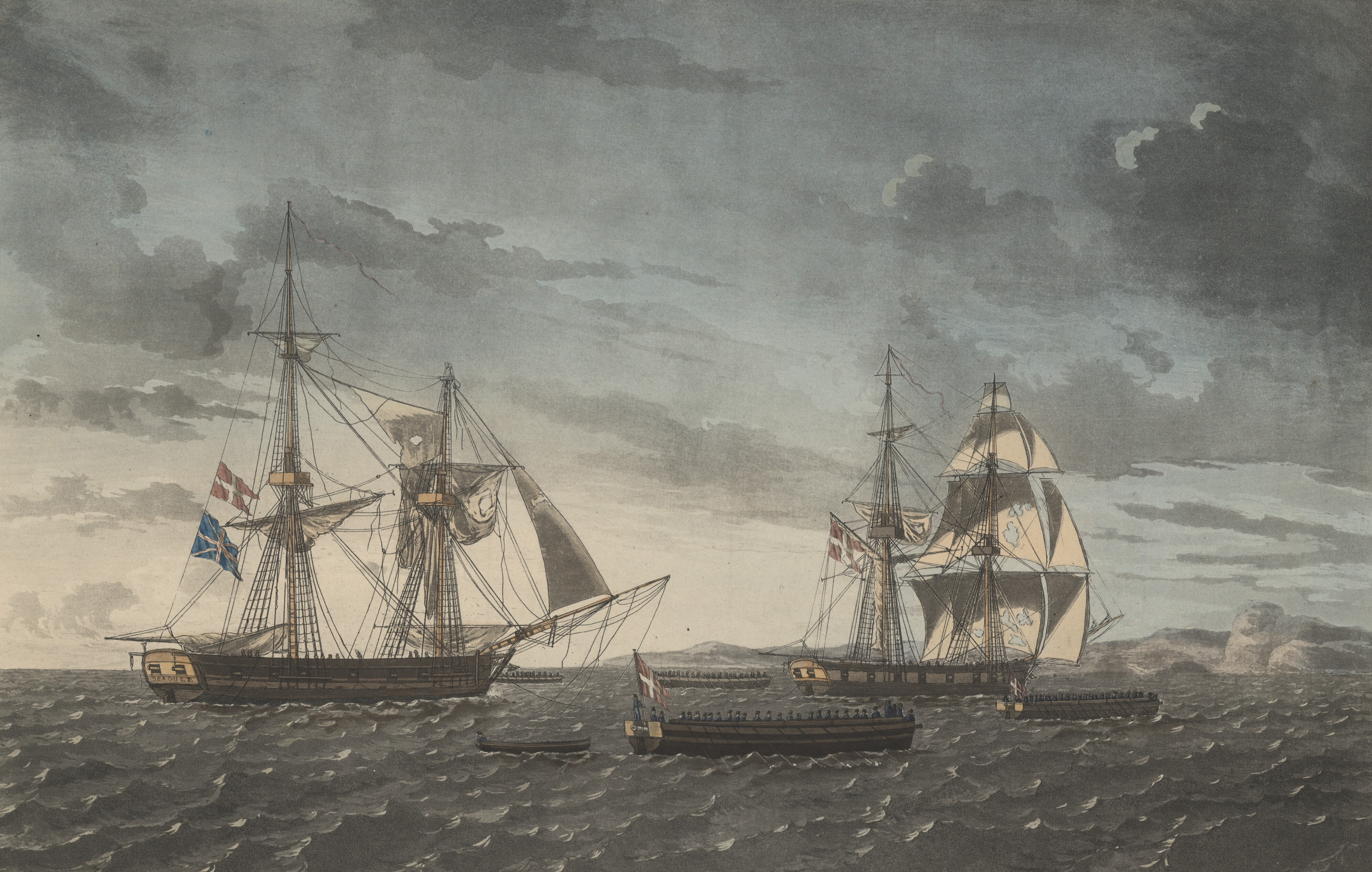
HDMS Lougen towing the captured HMS Seagull on 19 June 1808

As a volunteer cadet from the age of ten, Wigelsen was formally enrolled as a cadet from 1799 and on 6 July 1804 commissioned as a junior lieutenant. After some service in the home fleet he sailed with the frigate Diana, commanded by Sigvart Akeleyeto, to the West Indies in 1805. During this voyage Diana captured the London privateer Kent. Returning to Denmark in August 1806, from 1807 (after the Battle of Copenhagen) to 1810 Wigelsen was second in command of the brig HDMS Lougen in Norwegian waters. His ship was involved in action against a British brig later identified as HMS Childers, on 14 March 1808, and he participated in the capture, on 19 June 1808, of the British brig HMS Seagull.

Wigelsen took command of Seagull and recorded in his personal diary:

I took command of the prize. She had taken a great many direct hits in the bows as well as the side. So many hits that the holes were large and irregular and could not be plugged by normal methods. When I came on board the water was already over the lower decks and was rising fast. I managed to get the ship into harbour, however, and run aground. A little past midnight, she capsized and I had to escape by swimming. Happily, we later managed to raise the brig and she was used to good effect in the war.

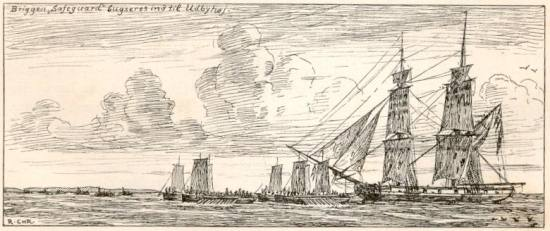
HMS Safeguard being towed into Udbyhøj on 29 June 1811

Promoted to senior lieutenant on 9 October 1809, Wigelsen commanded the three Norwegian gunboats (Valkyrien, Nornen, and Axel Thorsen) that accompanied Lougen and Langeland in Müller's Finnmark squadron, re-establishing the pomor trade routes of the far north that had been interdicted by British naval activity. The squadron took eleven merchant ships as prizes during this 1810 season. From 1811 to 1814 he commanded squadrons of gunboats in the Kattegat, initially four gunboats stationed at Grenaa, and capturing the British brig HMS Safeguard on 29 June 1811 which was towed into Udbyhoj at the exit from Randers fjord. On New Year's Eve of 1811 he received urgent orders to proceed immediately to Ryssensten Strand (north of Ringkøbing, on the west coast of Jutland) to take charge of operations centring on the wrecks of two British ships of the line, HMS St George and HMS Defence, which had been driven aground on 24 December 1811. Acting as the Receiver of Wreck, he submitted his report from the nearby manor house of Rammegaard on 10 February 1812.

Returning to the Kattegat, Wigelsen became acting head of the gunboat flotilla based on the island of Samsøe while his superior officer Jørgen Conrad de Falsen was on sick leave, recovering from wounds received the year before in an unsuccessful attack on a convoy off Hjelm. (Note: For much of this period the gunboats may have been frozen in, and the crews on winter furlough. Falsen returned to duty on 6 April 1812.) Wigelsen was then ordered to Grenaa where he now commanded a force of eight gunboats. This force, together with the gunboat flotilla from Samsøe under Falsen, took the action to the British on 18–19 August when the brig HMS Attack was captured by the Danish navy. (Note: Both Falsen and Wigelsen were senior lieutenants, but Falsen held seniority by 22 months and is thus credited with the capture.) The gunboat flotilla from Fladstrand was also involved in the actions of 18–19 August. Wigelsen and his gunboats continued to target British vessels in the Kattegat. When Wigelsen received intelligence that the British were planning an attack in overwhelming force to destroy his squadron, he ordered all his gunboats to evacuate to Kalundborg in January 1814. Wigelsen was created a Knight in the Order of the Dannebrog in 1811 and was awarded the Cross of Honour in 1812.

== After the war ==
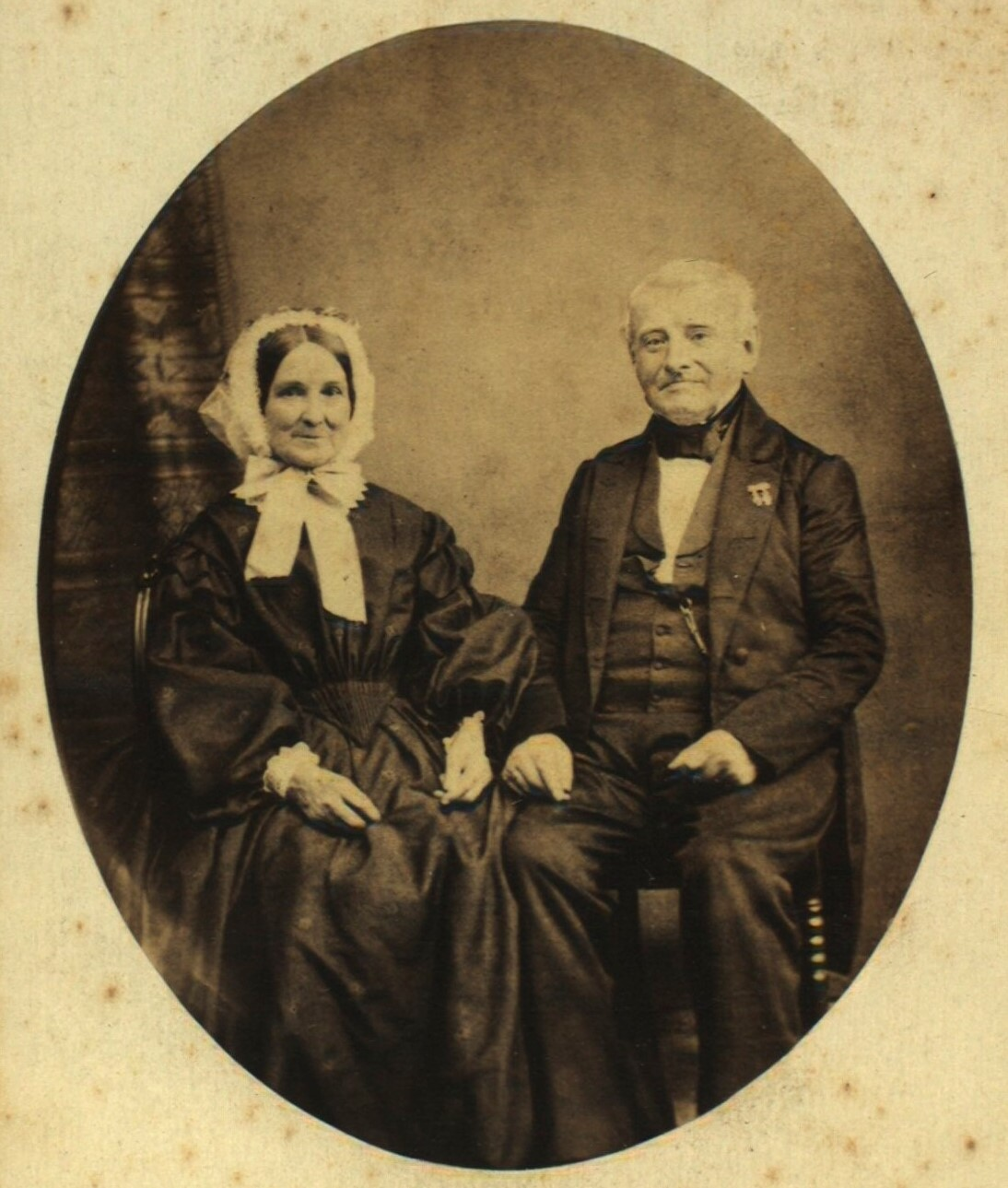
Broder Knud and Karen Magdalene Wigelsen

From 3 April 1814 he was given leave of absence to deal with some family problems. (His father had died in 1813). As hostilities ended Wigelsen sought early release from his naval duties which was granted with the promotion to lieutenant-captain, but without a pension. For several years he assumed the direction of the trading company founded by his father. Until 1817 the firm appeared profitable, but a series of accidents where ships were lost and their insurance companies failed could not be overcome and the once highly successful company of Wigelsen & sons had to be wound up in, or about, 1824.

Ten years after leaving the Danish navy in 1815 Wigelsen was appointed marine surveyor (Skibsmaaler) to the Royal Danish Navy in Copenhagen.

From 1832 he was appointed in a supernumerary position as inspector of the Customs and Excise department and a position on the committee of the Royal Assurance Company of Copenhagen. In 1837 he achieved further promotion to full captain. In 1838 he became a deputy in the Assurance company, and from 1841 until he retired in 1851 he was again in the customs service, latterly stationed in Roskilde.

The reorganisation of the whole of the Danish customs service in 1851 abolished his post. Wigelsen retired, this time with a pension.

Wigelsen died on 10 September 1867 in Copenhagen and is buried in Holmens cemetery.

== Citations (in Danish) ==
- Fra Krigens Tid (From the wartime 1807–1814) edited by N A Larsen, Christiana 1878
- Projekt Runeberg - Dansk Biografisk Lexikon Vol XVIII page 569
- T. A. Topsøe-Jensen og Emil Marquard (1935) “Officerer i den dansk-norske Søetat 1660-1814 og den danske Søetat 1814-1932“. (Danish Naval Officers) Two volumes.
