= List of shipwrecks in August 1872 =

The list of shipwrecks in August 1872 includes ships sunk, foundered, grounded, or otherwise lost during August 1872.

== 1 August ==
List of shipwrecks: 1 August 1872
Ship	State	Description
Anais	France	The schooner foundered. She was on a voyage from Pontrieux, Côtes-du-Nord to Sandarne, Sweden.
Lidador	Portugal	The full-rigged ship was wrecked at the mouth of the Paraná River.
Paul Elisa	France	The ship departed from New Orleans, Louisiana, United States for Liverpool, Lancashire, United Kingdom. No further trace, presumed foundered with the loss of all hands.
Shanghai	Spain	The barque was wrecked off Zambales, Spanish East Indies with the loss of seven of her crew.

== 2 August ==
List of shipwrecks: 2 August 1872
Ship	State	Description
Astarte	United Kingdom	The yawl ran aground at Cowes, Isle of Wight.
James Walter	United Kingdom	The ship struck a sunken wreck was and beached at Winterton-on-Sea, Norfolk in a waterlogged condition. She was on a voyage from Southampton, Hampshire to Dundee, Forfarshire. She was refloated on 6 August and towed in to Great Yarmouth, Norfolk.
Uhland	United Kingdom	The barque ran aground at Queenstown, County Cork. She was on a voyage from Boston to Queenstown. She was refloated.

== 4 August ==
List of shipwrecks: 4 August 1872
Ship	State	Description
Ciba Arica	Italy	The ship ran aground in the River Plate. She was on a voyage from Marseille, Bouches-du-Rhône, France to Buenos Aires, Argentina.
Heaton Hall	United Kingdom	The steamship was wrecked near Bizerte, Beylik of Tunis. Her crew were rescued by an Italian barque. She was on a voyage from Nicholaieff, Russia to Bremerhaven, Germany.
Parthenon	Ottoman Empire	The steamship ran aground and was wrecked at Urla. She was on a voyage from Smyrna to Adalia.
Phoenix	United Kingdom	The schooner foundered in the North Sea 6 nautical miles (11 km) off Cromer, Norfolk. Her crew were rescued by the steamship Lyon (Belgium). Phoenix was on a voyage from London to Stirling.
Telegraph	United Kingdom	The ship was discovered in a capsized condition off Terceira Island, Azores and was beached. She was a total loss.
Vente Cinco Novembre	Uruguay	The steamship collided with the steamship Onyx (United Kingdom) and sank. She was on a voyage from Montevideo to Asunción, Paraguay.

== 5 August ==
List of shipwrecks: 5 August 1872
Ship	State	Description
Conway	United Kingdom	The barque was driven ashore and severely damaged at Bristol, Gloucestershire. She was on a voyage from Quebec City, Canada to Bristol.
Kedron	Austria-Hungary	The brig was driven ashore and wrecked in the Gironde.
Maria	Russia	The yacht struck a rock off Haapsalu and foundered. She was on a voyage from Saint Petersburg to Riga.
Spindrift	United Kingdom	The tug sank in the River Nene 2 nautical miles (3.7 km) upstream of Sutton Bridge, Lincolnshire.
Vencedora	United Kingdom	The ship caught fire at Valparaíso, Chile. The fire was extinguished the next day.

== 6 August ==
List of shipwrecks: 6 August 1872
Ship	State	Description
Caspian	United Kingdom	The steamship was driven ashore on Belle Isle, Newfoundland Colony. Her crew were rescued. She was on a voyage from Montreal, Quebec, Canada to Waterford.
Francesco Seghezza	Flag unknown	The ship was wrecked off The Lizard, Cornwall, United Kingdom. She was on a voyage from Taganrog, Russia to London, United Kingdom.
John and Thomas	United Kingdom	The ship struck a rock and was severely damaged in Kyleakin Sound. She was on a voyage from Liverpool, Lancashire to Rotterdam, South Holland, Netherlands.

== 8 August ==
List of shipwrecks: 8 August 1872
Ship	State	Description
Crest	(United Kingdom of Great Britain and Ireland) Isle of Man	The ship was driven ashore near Fraserburgh, Aberdeenshire.
George	United Kingdom	The schooner ran aground at Peterhead, Aberdeenshire. She was on a voyage from West Wemyss, Fife to Banff, Aberdeenshire.
Gloria Maria	Norway	The ship ran aground at "Aarskilde", Denmark and was wrecked. Her crew were rescued. She was on a voyage from Königsberg, Germany to Copenhagen, Denmark.
Three Sisters	New Zealand	The cutter became a total wreck after she was stranded on the northern end of Great Barrier Island.

== 9 August ==
List of shipwrecks: 9 August 1872
Ship	State	Description
Brairken	Sweden	The steamship ran aground. She was on a voyage from Lübeck, Germany to Stockholm. She was refloated and completed her voyage.
Dumfries	United Kingdom	The steamship ran aground on the Doorin Rock, on the coast of County Donegal. She was on a voyage from Glasgow, Renfrewshire to Donegal. She was refloated on 24 August. Subsequently extended and returned to service.
Redesdale	United Kingdom	The steamship ran aground in the Danube 36 nautical miles (67 km) upstream of Sulina.
St. Maur	United Kingdom	The ship ran aground on the Nantucket Shoals, in the Atlantic Ocean off the coast of Massachusetts. She was on a voyage from New York to Liverpool, Lancashire. She was refloated and resumed her voyage.
Vicksburg	United Kingdom	The steamship was driven ashore at Father Point, Quebec, Canada. She was on a voyage from Liverpool, Lancashire to Quebec City.
Unnamed	United Kingdom	The Mersey Flat ran aground on the East Hoyle Bank, in Liverpool Bay.

== 10 August ==
List of shipwrecks: 10 August 1872
Ship	State	Description
Belle	United Kingdom	The ship ran aground at Harwich, Essex. She was on a voyage from Montreal, Quebec, Canada to Ipswich, Suffolk. She was refloated the next day and resumed her voyage.
Deva	United Kingdom	The ship was run into by the steamship Ville de Bordeaux (France) and sank at Valparaíso, Chile with the loss of six of her crew.
Hearts of Oak	United Kingdom	The brig collided with the steamship Lord Clive (United Kingdom and sank in the River Thames at Woolwich, Kent. Her crew were rescued by Lord Clive. Hearts of Oak was on a voyage from Guernsey, Channel Islands to London.
Pioneer	New Zealand	The 11-ton ketch stranded near the mouth of the Patea River and became a wreck.
Saxonia	New South Wales	The steamship sank at Newcastle.
Windward	United Kingdom	The yacht was driven ashore at Weymouth, Dorset.

== 11 August ==
List of shipwrecks: 11 August 1872
Ship	State	Description
Mercur	Denmark	The ship ran aground at Rudkøbing. She was on a voyage from Rudkøping to an English port.
Sailor	United Kingdom	The steamship ran aground on the Haisborough Sands, in the North Sea off the coast of Norfolk. She was on a voyage from London to Sunderland, County Durham. She was refloated on 13 August and put in to Great Yarmouth, Norfolk.
Try	United Kingdom	The ship was driven ashore at Southwold, Suffolk. She was on a voyage from Seaham, County Durham to Southwold.
Venture	New Zealand	The 20-ton ketch was beached near Ward after being holed on a reef near Cape Campbell in rough weather.

== 12 August ==
List of shipwrecks: 12 August 1872
Ship	State	Description
Creole	United Kingdom	The ship was driven ashore at Nethertown, Cumberland. She was on a voyage from Maryport, Cumberland to Dublin.
Marousje	Russia	The steamship put in to Brest, Finistère, France. She was on a voyage from Newcastle upon Tyne, Northumberland, United Kingdom to Taganrog.
Terzo	Italy	The brig put in to Stanley, Falkland Islands on fire and was scuttled. She was on a voyage from Newcastle upon Tyne to Callao, Peru.
Titania	United Kingdom	The schooner was abandoned 20 nautical miles (37 km) north west of the Smalls Lighthouse, Cornwall. Her crew were rescued by the steamship Great Western (United Kingdom).
Wasp	United Kingdom	The smack capsized at Hubberston Pill, Pembrokeshire. She was righted.

== 13 August ==
List of shipwrecks: 13 August 1872
Ship	State	Description
Aral	United Kingdom	The steamship collided with the steamship Khedive (United Kingdom) and sank in the Hooghly River.
Maggie	United Kingdom	The brig was destroyed by fire at Santa Martha. She was on a voyage from New York, United States to Savanilla, United States of Colombia.
Merkur	Denmark	The ship ran aground at Rudkøbing. She was on a voyage from Rudkøbing to London, United Kingdom.
Unnamed	United Kingdom	The schooner ran aground on the West Hoyle Bank, in Liverpool Bay. She was refloated on 15 August and resumed her voyage.

== 14 August ==
List of shipwrecks: 14 August 1872
Ship	State	Description
Contest	United Kingdom	The tug sank at Whitby, Yorkshire.
Erin	United Kingdom	The steamship ran aground at Havre de Grâce, Seine-Inférieure, France. She was on a voyage from Havre de Grâce to New York, United States. She was refloated the next day and resumed her voyage.
Sarah Elizabeth	United Kingdom	The smack sprang a leak and sank off Perranvose, Cornwall. Her crew were rescued.
Tome	Guatemala	The coaster, a steamship, was wrecked at Constitución, Chile.

== 15 August ==
List of shipwrecks: 15 August 1872
Ship	State	Description
Amalia	Germany	The brig was wrecked on the Florida Reef.
Bienville	United States	The steamship was destroyed by fire off the Bahamas with the loss of 30 of the 127 people on board. She was on a voyage from New York to Aspinwall, United States of Colombia.
Emilia	Russia	The ship ran aground at Philadelphia, Pennsylvania, United States. She was on a voyage from Philadelphia to a British port.
Sunshine	China	The steamship was wrecked at Breaker Point, Hong Kong. She was on a voyage from Hong Kong to Amoy.
Sweet Home	United Kingdom	The ship was driven ashore at Youghal, County Cork. Her crew were rescued by the Youghal Lifeboat. She was on a voyage from Youghal to Cardiff, Glamorgan.

== 16 August ==
List of shipwrecks: 16 August 1872
Ship	State	Description
Clematis	United Kingdom	The brig was driven ashore and wrecked at Cape Razo, Portugal. Her crew were rescued. She was on a voyage from Cardiff, Glamorgan to Lisbon, Portugal.
Village Belle	United Kingdom	The smack collided with the steamship Malta (United Kingdom) and sank off Wicklow Head, County Wicklow. Three crew were rescued by Malta. Village Belle was on a voyage from Preston, Lancashire to Plymouth, Devon.

== 17 August ==
List of shipwrecks: 17 August 1872
Ship	State	Description
Gypsy Bride	United Kingdom	The lighter sank at Glasgow, Renfrewshire. She was raised on 21 August.
Preston	United Kingdom	The barque ran aground in the Hellegat. She was refloated.
Saga	Norway	The barque ran aground in the Hellegat. She was refloated.
Telayta	United Kingdom	The schooner foundered in the Bristol Channel. Her crew were rescued by the steamship Vulture (United Kingdom). Telayta was on a voyage from Youghal, County Cork to Newport, Monmouthshire.

== 18 August ==
List of shipwrecks: 18 August 1872
Ship	State	Description
Alarm	New Zealand	The 15-ton ketch was wrecked after stranding on a bar at the mouth of the Rangitikei River.
Sarah Wascoe	United Kingdom	The ship was driven ashore at Nexø, Denmark. She was on a voyage from Liverpool, Lancashire to Libava, Courland Governorate.
William Mitchell	United Kingdom	The barque was driven ashore at Duncansby Head, Caithness. Her crew were rescued. She was on a voyage from Quebec City, Canada to West Hartlepool, county Durham.

== 19 August ==
List of shipwrecks: 19 August 1872
Ship	State	Description
Amlwch	United Kingdom	The schooner ran aground on the Leigh Middle Sand, in the Thames Estuary. She was on a voyage from London to Amlwch, Anglesey.
Annie M. Gray	United States	The ship departed from Vineyard Haven, Massachusetts for Copenhagen, Denmark. No further trace, presumed foundered with the loss of all hands.
Countess of Seafield	United Kingdom	The ship was driven ashore at Rattray Head, Aberdeenshire. She was on a voyage from a Baltic port to the River Spey. She was refloated and resumed her voyage.
Flora	United Kingdom	The steamship ran aground, capsized and sank at Cardiff, Glamorgan. All on board were rescued. She was on a voyage from Burnham-on-Sea, Somerset to Cardiff.
Friends	United Kingdom	The schooner was abandoned off the Tuskar Rock. Her crew were rescued. She was on a voyage from Newport, Monmouthshire to Waterford.
George and Henry	United States	The barque capsized in a squall in the Bay of Tome, Chile. Her crew were rescued.
Glendon	United Kingdom	The steamship struck the Split Rock and was severely damaged. She was on a voyage from Portland to Saint John, New Brunswick, Canada.
Jean	United Kingdom	The smack sprang a leak and sank off Sanda Island, in the Firth of Clyde. Her crew were rescued. She was on a voyage from Ardrossan, Ayrshire to Lismore, County Waterford.
Jorge	Spain	The steamship departed from Havana, Cuba for Liverpool, Lancashire, United Kingdom. No further trace, presumed foundered with the loss of all hands.
Mercedita	Spain	The schooner was discovered by the brig Syracuse (Italy) in a derelict condition. She was taken in to Gibraltar.
Roscoe	United States	The 313.37-ton whaling bark was stove in by ice and abandoned in the Arctic Ocean while anchored off Point Barrow, Department of Alaska.

== 20 August ==
List of shipwrecks: 20 August 1872
Ship	State	Description
Andreas	Flag unknown	The schooner sprang a leak and foundered off Bornholm, Denmark. Her crew were rescued.
Jessie	United Kingdom	The smack sank off Sanda Island, in the Firth of Clyde. Her crew were rescued.
Shark	United Kingdom	The steamship was holed by her anchor in the Caledonian Canal and was run ashore. She was on a voyage from Liverpool, Lancashire to Stettin, Germany.

== 21 August ==
List of shipwrecks: 21 August 1872
Ship	State	Description
Macedonian	United Kingdom	The ship ran aground on the Svineboderne, in the Baltic Sea. She was on a voyage from Kronstadt, Russia to Dover, Kent. She was refloated and towed in to Helsingør, Denmark by a steamship.
Unanimity	Germany	The barque foundered in the Baltic Sea 50 nautical miles (93 km) west of Rixhöft, with the loss of two of her crew. Survivors were rescued by Guiding Star (United Kingdom). Unanimity was on a voyage from Sunderland, County Durham, United Kingdom to Kronstadt.
Wilster	United Kingdom	The steamship ran aground at West Hartlepool, County Durham. She was on a voyage from West Hartlepool to Middlesbrough, Yorkshire. She was refloated and taken in to West Hartlepool for repairs.

== 22 August ==
List of shipwrecks: 22 August 1872
Ship	State	Description
Ebenezer	Norway	The ship departed from New York, United States for Falmouth, Cornwall or Queenstown, County Cork, United Kingdom. No further trace, presumed foundered with the loss of all hands.
Edward Lindsay	United Kingdom	The steam wherry struck a rock at Marsden, County Durham. She was refloated and beached.
Giacinto	Italy	The ship was wrecked at Flamborough Head, Yorkshire, United Kingdom. She was on a voyage from Newcastle upon Tyne, Northumberland, United Kingdom to Naples.
Panama	France	The steamship struck rocks and sank at Santander, Spain. All on board were rescued. She was on a voyage from Marseille, Bouches-du-Rhône to Havana, Cuba.

== 23 August ==
List of shipwrecks: 23 August 1872
Ship	State	Description
Erne	Flag unknown	The ship ran aground in the Min River at Sharp Peak.
Paganini	United Kingdom	The schooner ran aground in the River Foyle. She was on a voyage from New York, United States to Londonderry.

== 24 August ==
List of shipwrecks: 24 August 1872
Ship	State	Description
America	United States	The passenger steamship was destroyed by fire at Yokohama Japan with the loss of between nineteen and 70 lives. She was on a voyage from San Francisco, California to Yokohama and Hong Kong.

== 25 August ==
List of shipwrecks: 25 August 1872
Ship	State	Description
Batavia	Netherlands	The paddle steamer ran aground in the Maas. She was on a voyage from London, United Kingdom to Rotterdam, South Holland. She was refloated and completed her voyage.
Scindia	United Kingdom	The steamship was driven ashore on Gozo, Malta. She was refloated and taken in to Malta for repairs.

== 26 August ==
List of shipwrecks: 26 August 1872
Ship	State	Description
Hotspur	United Kingdom	The steamship was driven ashore near Algeciras, Spain.
Twin Sisters	United Kingdom	The schooner ran aground on the Long Sand, in the North Sea off the coast of Essex. She was on a voyage from Aberdeen to Dunkirk, Nord, France. She was refloated but sank off the Kentish Knock. Her crew were rescued by Nova Giuseppe (Italy).

== 27 August ==
List of shipwrecks: 27 August 1872
Ship	State	Description
Batavia	Netherlands	The paddle steamer ran aground at Alblasserdam, South Holland. She was on a voyage from Rotterdam, South Holland to London, United Kingdom. She was refloated and taken in to Dordrecht, South Holland.
Fredericke	Germany	The ship sprang a leak and was beached at Fredrikshavn. She was on a voyage from Papenburg to Danzig. She was refloated the next day and taken in to Fredrikshavn.

== 28 August ==
List of shipwrecks: 28 August 1872
Ship	State	Description
China	Spain	The ship foundered in the Indian Ocean (30°24′S 27°23′E). All 40 people on board were rescued by Tantallon Castle (United Kingdom).
James C. Stephenson	United Kingdom	The steamship caught fire and was run ashore near Belém, Portugal. Her passengers were taken off by the schooner Bahia (Spain). James C. Stephenson was on a voyage from Calcutta, India to London.
Johanna	Germany	The ship ran aground off the Filsand Lighthouse, Russia and was wrecked. She was on a voyage from Eckernförde to Saint Petersburg, Russia.
Mentor	Netherlands	The galiot struck a sunken wreck and foundered off the Galloper Sand, in the North Sea. Her crew were rescued by Young Ellis (United Kingdom). Mentor was on a voyage from Newcastle upon Tyne, Northumberland, United Kingdom to Naples, Italy.
Perseveranza	Spain	The steamship was wrecked near Porto, Portugal with the loss of 30 lives.
Sir Robert Hodgson	United Kingdom	The ship was driven ashore on "Long Island", in the Gulf of Smyrna. She was refloated on 12 October.
Victory	United Kingdom	The schooner ran aground on Heligoland.

== 29 August ==
List of shipwrecks: 29 August 1872
Ship	State	Description
Gotthard	Switzerland	The steamship collided with the steamship Concordia (Switzerland) and sank in Lake Zürich. All on board were rescued by Concordia, whose purser was killed in the collision.
Hispania	United Kingdom	The steamship ran aground on the Maplin Sand, in the North Sea off the coast of Essex.
Maria	United Kingdom	The ship departed from Nantes, Loire-Inférieure for Cardiff, Glamorgan. No further trace, presumed foundered with the loss of all hands.
Metis	United States	The 1,238-gross register ton cargo liner, a steamship, sank in 130 feet (40 m) of water 4.5 nautical miles (8.3 km; 5.2 mi) east-southeast of Watch Hill, Rhode Island, (41°16.55′N 071°46.12′W) with the loss of 67 lives after colliding at night with the schooner Nettie Cushing (United States). There were 85 survivors.
Tamar	United Kingdom	The barque ran aground on the Maplin Sand.

== 30 August ==
List of shipwrecks: 30 August 1872
Ship	State	Description
Himalaya	United States	The ship was sighted off Anjer, Netherlands East Indies whilst on a voyage from New York to Hong Kong. No further trace, presumed foundered with the loss of all hands.
Intrepid	United Kingdom	The fishing trawler sprang a leak and sank off the coast of Norfolk. Her crew were rescued by the schooner Emma (United Kingdom).
Signal	United States	The schooner was run down and sunk off Matinicus. crew saved.

== 31 August ==
List of shipwrecks: 31 August 1872
Ship	State	Description
Abbey	United Kingdom	The brig was abandoned in the Atlantic Ocean. Her crew were rescued by Gladiolus (United Kingdom). Abbey was on a voyage from Rodosto, Ottoman Empire to Hull, Yorkshire.
Augusta	United Kingdom	The Galway hooker was run down and sunk off Plymouth, Devon by the fishing trawler Skim of the Sea (United Kingdom) with the loss of two of her three crew.
Defender	United Kingdom	The barque was driven ashore on Grindstone Island, Ontario, Canada. She was condemned.
Gea	Sweden	The barque was abandoned in the Atlantic Ocean. Her crew were rescued by Gladiolus (United Kingdom). Gea was on a voyage from Gävle to Philadelphia, Pennsylvania, United States.
Helen Snow	United States	After suffering ice damage on 19 August, the 215-ton whaler, a barque, was abandoned in the Arctic Ocean. She later was salvaged, repaired, and returned to service.
Immanuel	Netherlands	The brig ran aground and sank in the Uruguay River. She was on a voyage from Paysandú, Uruguay to an English port.
Sarah	United Kingdom	The ship foundered in the Bristol Channel. Her crew were rescued. She was on a voyage from Swansea, Glamorgan to Fremington, Devon.

== Unknown date ==
List of shipwrecks: Unknown date in August 1872
Ship	State	Description
Aberystwyth	United Kingdom	The ship was abandoned in the Grand Banks of Newfoundland. Her crew were rescued by Kawe (United Kingdom).
Alliance	United Kingdom	The ship was driven ashore near "Eitzenloch", Germany.
Amisia	Germany	The ship was lost in the Gulf of Florida.
A. Vologda	Russia	The ship was lost at Arkhangelsk.
HNoMS Axel Thorsen	Royal Norwegian Navy	The gunboat was lost in the Arctic Ocean off Novaya Zemlya, Russia.
Bessie Rodgers	United Kingdom	The ship collided with another vessel and foundered off Newport, Rhode Island, United States before 10 August. She was on a voyage from Dublin to Newport.
Brunswick	United Kingdom	The steamship ran aground at the mouth of the Tagus. She was on a voyage from Liverpool, Lancashire to Maranhão, Brazil. She was refloated and resumed her voyage.
Cameronian	United Kingdom	The ship was abandoned off Cape Horn, Chile before 5 August. She was on a voyage from Newcastle upon Tyne, Northumberland to Coquimbo, Chile.
Carnaquheen	New South Wales	The ship ran aground and was severely damaged. She was on a voyage from Newcastle to Wallaroo, South Australia. She was refloated and taken in to Adelaide, South Australia.
Charlaw	United Kingdom	The steamship ran aground in the River Barrow. She was refloated on 26 August and taken in to New Ross, County Wexford.
Charles Dickens	United Kingdom	The steamship ran aground on the Shipwash Sand, in the North Sea off the coast of Suffolk. She was on a voyage from Cardiff, Glamorgan to Riga, Russia. She was refloated and resumed her voyage.
Cordelia	Canada	The ship was driven ashore on Scatarie Island, Nova Scotia.
Craigellachie	United Kingdom	The ship was abandoned at sea. Her crew were rescued. She was on a voyage from Liverpool to Callao, Peru.
Credo	United Kingdom	The ship was abandoned off the Grand Banks of Newfoundland before 2 August. She was on a voyage from Darien, Georgia, United States to Aberystwyth, Cardiganshire.
Criterion	United Kingdom	The brig sank at Blakeney, Norfolk. Her eight crew were rescued by the Wells Lifeboat.
Diamond	United States	The tug sank in Green Bay.
Dover Castle	United Kingdom	The steamship was destroyed by fire off Coquimbo, Chile. Her crew were rescued. She was on the return leg of her maiden voyage, from Callao, Peru to Liverpool, Lancashire.
Enmore	United Kingdom	The steamship was driven ashore at Dungeness, Kent. She was on a voyage from Sunderland, County Durham to Demerara, British Guiana. She was refloated on 9 August.
Fairfax	United Kingdom	The steamship ran aground at Havre de Grâce, Seine-Inférieure, France.
Glenallan	United Kingdom	The ship was driven ashore on "Cariboo Island". She was on a voyage from Montreal, Quebec, Canada to the Clyde. She broke up on 31 August.
Gresham	France	The ship was wrecked on the coast of Saint Domingo before 20 August. Her crew were rescued. She was on a voyage from Saint Thomas to Saint Domingo.
Harmonie	Norway	The ship was driven ashore and wrecked at Leven, Fife, United Kingdom.
Marie Hortense	France	The ship was wrecked on the St. Anne Shoals, off the coast of Sierra Leone. She was on a voyage from Granville, Manche to Grand-Popo, Dahomey.
Neptunus	Norway	The barque was wrecked on the coast of County Down, United Kingdom. Her fourteen crew were rescued by the Tyrella Lifeboat.
New Buxton	United Kingdom	The fishing lugger was abandoned off Scarborough, Yorkshire. Her nine crew were rescued by the Scarborough Lifeboat.
N. J. Miller	Canada	The schooner was abandoned in the Atlantic Ocean. She was discovered in a derelict condition on 1 September and towed in to Boothbay, Maine, United States.
Rachel	(flag) Denmark	The ship collided with another vessel and was abandoned. She was on a voyage from Copenhagen to "Oeffend".
Rosetta	United Kingdom	The ship was lost whilst on a voyage from Rota to Swansea, Glamorgan. Her crew were rescued.
Stockholm	United Kingdom	The steamship ran aground at Helsinki, Grand Duchy of Finland. She was on a voyage from Newport, Monmouthshire to Helsingki.
Woodside	United Kingdom	The brig ran aground at the mouth of the Adour.
