= Battle of Silda =

1810 naval battle of the Gunboat War

Coordinates: 62°00′52″N 5°11′02″E

- Part of the Gunboat War
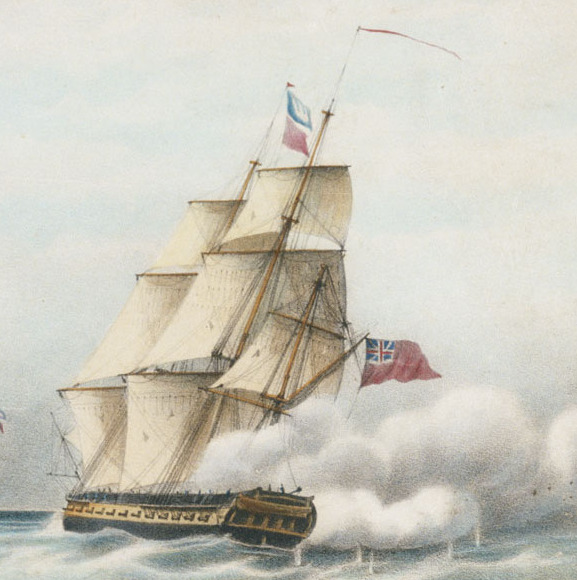
- HMS Belvidera, which fought in the battle
Date	23 July 1810
Location	Silda, Norway
Result	British victory

Belligerents
United Kingdom	Denmark-Norway

Commanders and leaders
Richard Byron	Gabriel Heiberg

Strength
2 frigates	2 schooners 1 gunboat

Casualties and losses
Unknown	4 killed 1 schooner captured 1 gunboat scuttled

Battle of Silda (Affæren ved Silden or Affæren ved Stadt) was a naval battle fought on 23 July 1810 between the United Kingdom of Great Britain and Ireland and Denmark–Norway near the Norwegian island of Silda in Sogn og Fjordane county. The battle occurred during the Gunboat War, itself part of the Napoleonic Wars. In the battle, two British frigates captured or destroyed three or four Dano-Norwegian gunboats. The Danish-Norwegian and British accounts of the battle differ.

== Danish-Norwegian account ==
The Dano-Norwegian Navy had based three gun-schooners Odin, Thor, and Balder, and the gun-barge Cort Adeler at the pilot station on Silda. However, only Thor and Balder, plus a third, smaller gunboat, were involved in the battle.

On 23 July the British frigates HMS Belvidera, Captain Richard Byron, and HMS Nemesis, Captain William Ferris, launched their assault. One of the Dano-Norwegian boats was able to hit at least one of the British boats, killing several British soldiers. Still, the British captured the station. The crew of one of the Dano-Norwegian boats scuttled their vessel and escaped. (Note: This was kanonjolle Nr.5 - a two-masted gunboat (or gunyawl), of 20 men, and one 24-pounder gun and two-4-pounder howitzers.) The British took the other two captured vessels as prizes and sent their crews as prisoner of war in England. The British also captured merchantmen moored in the vicinity.

== British account ==
Belvidera and Nemesis were sailing close in-shore of Studtland, Norway. On the evening of 22 July a boat from Belvidera scouting a deep bay sighted three Dano-Norwegian gun-vessels. The next morning seven boats from the two frigates entered the creek and cut out the two larger Dano-Norwegian vessels. The British suffered no casualties, though the Norwegians lost four men killed.

The two larger vessels, Balder and Thor, commanded by Lieutenants Dahlreup and Rasmusen, were schooner-rigged. Each mounted two long 24-pounder guns and six 6-pounder howitzers and had a crew of 45 men. The third gun-vessel, Gunboat No. 5, was of a smaller class; she carried one long 24-pounder and had a crew of 25 men. Her crew ran her up a fiord where they abandoned her; the decision was then made to burn her.

The British prize money reckoning refers to three vessels, Balder, Thor, and Fortuna. Fortuna may have been a merchant vessel seized at the time.

== Aftermath ==
The local Norwegian commander, vicar Gabriel Heiberg, failed to alert other Dano-Norwegian naval vessels nearby that could have helped repel the attack. He also later issued an order to keep out of the way to avoid combat, an action for which he later underwent a court-martial.

== Footnotes ==
Notes

Citations

== Sources ==
- An article on the event from nrk.no (in Norwegian)
- Some contemporary reports (in Norwegian)
