= HMS Attack (1804) =

Brig of the Royal Navy

History

United Kingdom
- Name: HMS Attack
- Ordered: 9 January 1804
- Builder: Robert Adams, Chapel, Southampton
- Laid down: March 1804
- Launched: 9 August 1804
- Commissioned: August 1804
- Captured: 19 August 1812

General characteristics
- Class & type: Archer-class gunbrig
- Tons burthen: 180 18/94 (bm)
- Length: Overall: 80 ft 1 3/4 in (24.4 m); Keel: 65 ft 11 1/4 in (20.1 m)
- Beam: 22 ft 8 in (6.9 m)
- Draught: 9 ft 5 in (2.9 m)
- Complement: 50
- Armament: 10 × 18-pounder carronades + 2 × 18-pounder chase guns

HMS Attack was launched in 1804 as a later Archer-class gunbrig. Danish gunboats captured Attack in August 1812.

== Career ==
In August 1804 Lieutenant Thomas Swain commissioned Attack for the Channel.

On 28 January 1806 Attack was in company with Growler off Brest. They sighted two luggers and Growler captured one. The prize was the French privateer lugger Voltiguer, of six 9-pounder guns and 66 men. She was one day out of Saint-Malo and had not captured anything. (Note: Voltigeur was a privateer lugger from Saint-Malo built in Dinant in 1805 and commissioned in January 1806. She was under the command of Alexandre Le Grand with 64 men and six guns.)

From her the British learned that the other lugger was also a French privateer and Attack set out in pursuit. After a nine-hour, circular chase Attack succeeded in capturing her quarry. The quarry was the privateer Sorcier, of 14 guns and 60 men under the command of Guillaume Francoise Neele. During the chase she had thrown 10 of her 14 guns overboard. She was two days out of Saint-Malo, had captured nothing, but was provisioned for a two-month cruise. (Note: Sorcier was a privateer lugger from Saint-Malo, built there in 1805 and commissioned in December under a Captain Néel, with 60 men and four guns. Her capture occurred soon after she departed for her first cruise.)

Sorciere and Voltigier arrived at Plymouth on 1 February.

On 19 April 1806, 24 men from the hired armed brig Colpoys and Attack, under Lieutenants Thomas Swain and Thomas Ussher, landed at the entrance of the River Doelan (Douillan), spiked two 12-pounder guns of a battery, captured two chasse-marées, and destroyed a signal post.

In the course of 1806 Attack also chased on shore a convoy of merchantmen under the escort of two brigs and a lugger. One of the vessels she took, and others she contrived to destroy.

For nearly two years Lieutenant Swain was employed with a schooner under his orders in watching the Passage du Raz. Eventually he saw the French fleet come out. He reported this to Sir John Duckworth.

On 18 June 1809 Attack recaptured the transport Tigre.

Between 30 July and 10 August Attack was one of the 40-plus British vessels that participated in the ill-fated.Walcheren Campaign.

Attack and Bold were among the vessels driven ashore near Yarmouth, Isle of Wight in a gale on 6 January 1811. Some weeks later Attack, Bold, and a merchantmen were eventually gotten off and came into the harbour.

In November 1811 Lieutenant Charles Walker was appointed to command Attack, She was recommissioned that month.

In 1812 Lieutenant Richard Simmonds transferred from command of the prison ship HMS Glory.

On 4 July 1812 Attack was cruising some 4 miles off Calais. In the evening Lieutenant Simmonds sighted a transport galiot, a sloop, and a privateer coming out of the harbour. They sailed along the shore and Simmonds knew that if he tried to attack them too soon they would turn back, so he made sail to windward hoping to lure them out. Attack became becalmed so Simmonds sent her gig with six men, under the command of Attack's second master, Mr. Couney, to cut one out. At midnight, Couney and his men found the galiot, under tow by the privateer. Despite small arms fire from the privateer, they boarded the galiot as men from the privateer boarded from the other side. Couney killed one of the privateers, which led the rest of the men from the privateer to withdraw. The British then took possession of the galiot.

The galiot was transport No. 637, of 256 tons (bm), with a crew of 16 men armed with small arms. (Note: Although there is no readily accessible information on transport No.637, background information on the numbered transports is available.) The privateer was armed with a 6-pounder gun, swivel guns, and small arms. She had a crew of 30 men under the command of lieutenant de vaisseau Gröthe.

== Fate ==
In August 1812, during the Gunboat War, Captain Chetham of HMS Hamadryad sent Attack to Randers Fjord in Denmark to recall HMS Wrangler and Hamadryad's barge. She took the barge in tow and set out to return to the squadron off Sejero. In the evening of the 18th they were about six miles off Foreness when they sighted two gun-vessels. The two Danish gun-vessels were the lead elements of a division of some 10 to 12 gun-vessels.

An engagement developed. After two hours the Danes broke off the action. Attack, under tow by Hamadryad's barge, steered for Wrangler, which was some way off and also under attack by another division of gun-vessels. strong currents and light winds prevented Attack from reaching Wrangler, which soon disappeared from view.

Attack's crew set to repairing her damage. She had her main boom shot away, her foremast and bowsprit shot through, and three guns dismounted. A little after 2a.m., a large number of Danish gun-vessels were seen approaching.

The Danish vessels formed a crescent off Attack's larboard side. The action lasted until 3:20a.m. After she had taken two men killed and 14 wounded and had her rigging destroyed and her hulled shot through in several places, Simmonds struck.

The Danish flotilla had consisted of 14 gunvessels each armed with two 24-pounder guns and two howitzers; they had crews of 65–70 men. There were also four rowboats with swivel guns and howitzers. Attack had a crew of only 49 men, including the barge's crew. Nine of her crew had been captured earlier while rowing guard off Hielam. An officer and six men were away in a prize. The court martial of Lieutenant Simmonds for the loss of Attack, exonerated him.

=== Danish records ===
Danish records put the action off Grenå. The commander of the Danish gun boat flotilla based at Samsø was Jørgen Conrad de Falsen. Lieutenant Wigelsen, who had been acting head of the gunboats at Samsøe while Falsen was on sick leave, took command of eight gunboats at Grenå after Falsen returned to duty on 6 April 1812.

The Danes took Attack into service as The Attacke, but details of her subsequent fate are lacking. (Note: She is listed in a register of Danish vessels, but without an actual page with details. She is not listed in the Royal Danish Naval Museum's list of captured British ships.)
