= Rammegaard =

General information
- Location: Rammegårdvej 26; 7620 Lemvig, Denmark
- Coordinates: 56°28′58.03″N 8°11′38.5″E
- Construction started: 15th century
- Completed: 1916

Rammegaard is a manor house and estate situated southwest of Lemvig, between Nissum Fjord and Nissum Bredning (Nissum broad), in northwest Jutland, Denmark. From 1681 until 1798 the estate was owned by the Barons of Rysensteen but was not part of the barony. The current main building is from 1916. Rammedige, a 410 m-long (1,350 ft) protected defensive rampart, is situated close to the manor house. It is said to date from a conflict with king Angul.

== History ==
From the late 15th century it was owned by several generations of the family Spend, and after 1586 the Skram family. Especially in the period 1637-1661 the estates economy was in poor shape as the rivalries between Denmark and Sweden sent armies fighting and plundering over the land.

In 1682 the estate was sold to Baron Christian Juul of Rysensteen in whose family (see Henrik Rysensteen) it remained until 1798, although no baron ever lived at Rammegaard. In 1798 the estate and manor was auctioned to two individuals (Peter Severin Fønss and Ulrik Chr. von Schmidten) who specialised in breaking up estates and selling parcels of land, so throughout the 19th century ownership of the manor changed many times.
In 1905 the house and farm were bought by J L Laursen who had first been employed at Rammegaard as a lowly herd boy. Laursen gained an education in dairy production and built a new manor house in 1916. Laursen's family lived on the estate until 1960.

== An event ==
On 24 December 1811 two British warships (HMS St George and HMS Defence (1763) were driven ashore at Ryssensten Strand close to Rammegaard. The Danish authorities appointed Lieutenant Wigelsen as Receiver of Wreck, and it was from Rammegaard that he submitted his final report in February 1812.

== Architecture ==
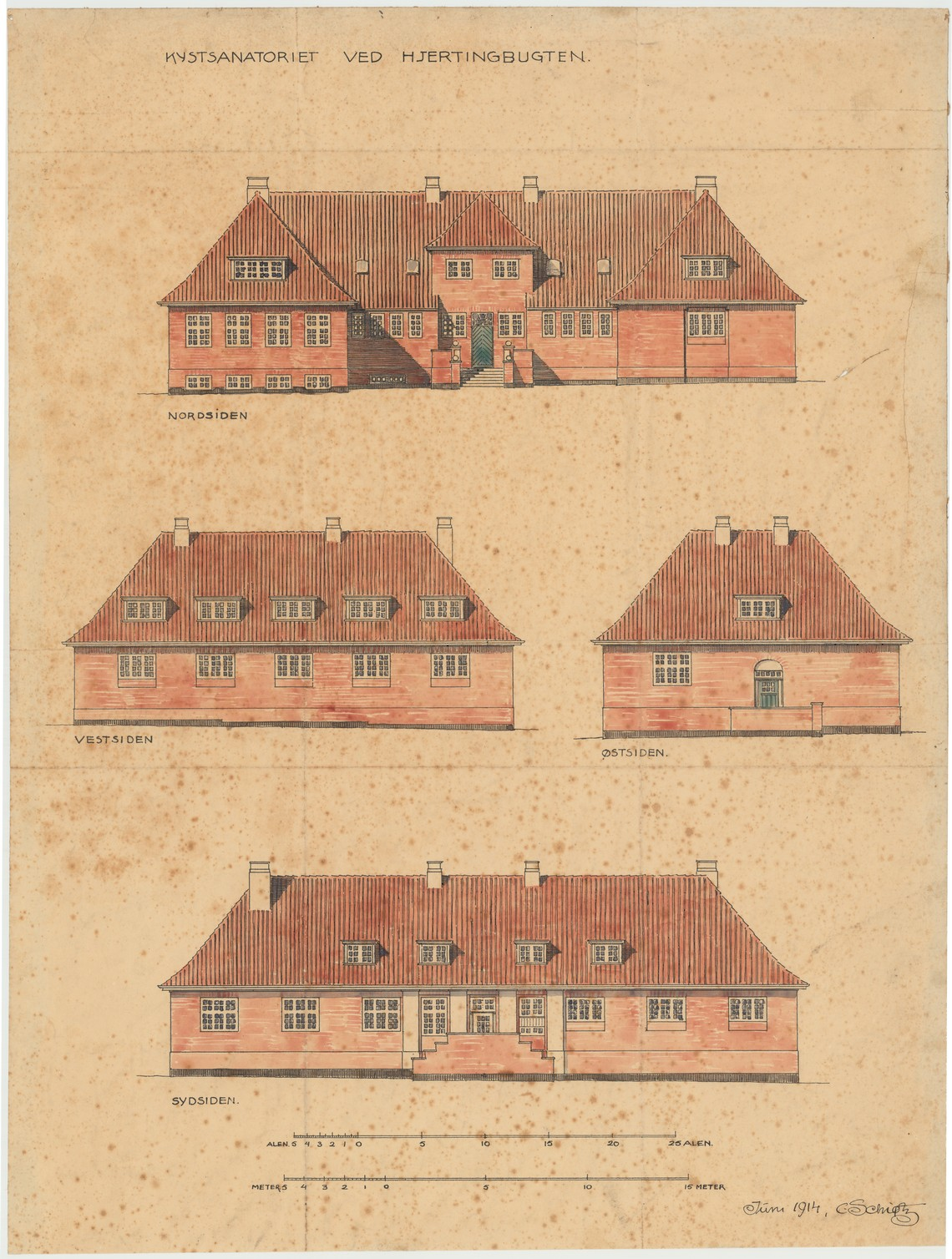
Rendering for the building.

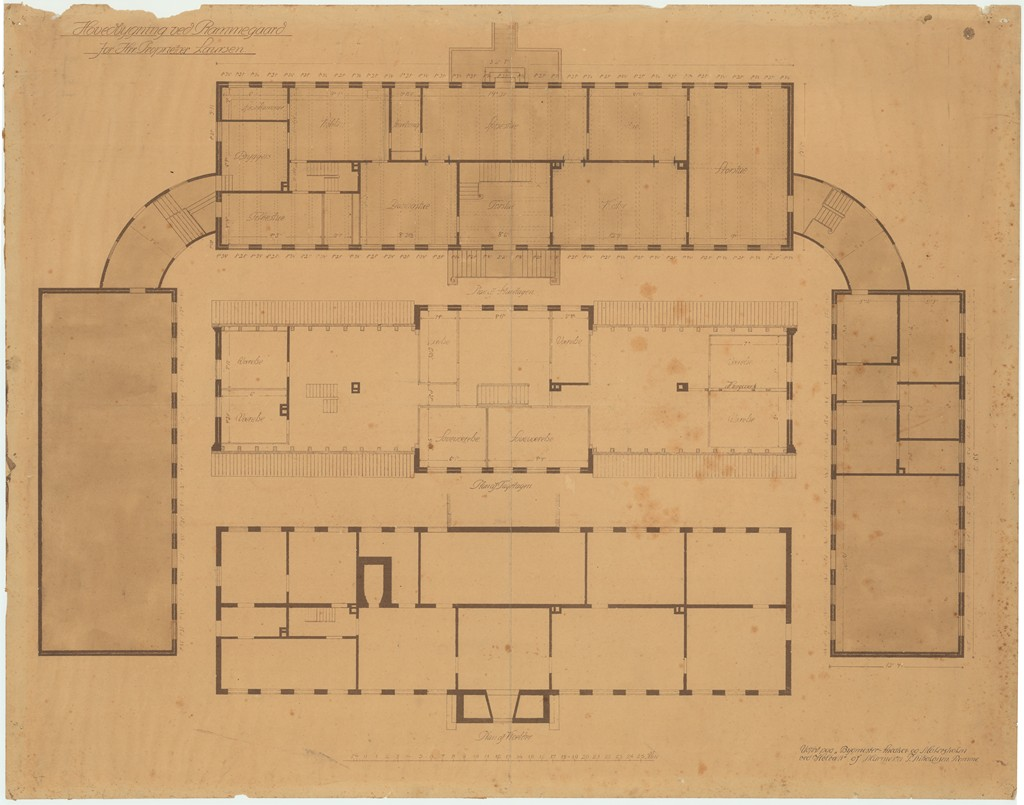
Plan of the building.

The building is a three-winged complex constructed in red brick, contrasted by white-painted windows and a white dentillated cornice, to a design provided by the Bedre Byggeskik movement. The facade of the main wing features a two-storey median risalit. The hip roof is clad in red tile. The secondary wings are connected to the main wing via two curved connectors.

== Today ==
The estate has since 1997 been owned by Kristian Brokman and is operated as a pig farm. It covers 389 hectares of land of which 380 hectares is farmland, 3 hectares is woodland and 5 hectares is meadows.

== List of owners ==
- (1483- )Anders Spend
- ( - )Jens Spend
- ( - )Anders Spend
- ( -1586)Jens Spend
- (1586- )Iver Skram
- ( -1607)Erik Skram
- (1625- )Anne Vind, gift Skram
- ( -1631)Ellen Skram
- ( -1631)Anne Skram
- ( -1637)Hartvig Huitfeldt
- (1637-1661)Maren Skram, gift 1) Huitfeldt og 2) von Obelitz
- (1661-1682)Balthazar Gebhart von Obelitz
- (1682-1690)Christian Juul-Rysensteen
- (1690-1694)Joh. Marie Ruse, gift Juul-Rysensteen
- (1690-1749)Ove Henrik Juul-Rysensteen
- (1749-1769)Otto Henrik Juul-Rysensteen
- (1769-1782)Christian Frederik Juul-Rysensteen
- (1782-1783)Christiane Dorothea Mohrsen gift Juul
- (1783-1798)O. H. Juul
- (1798-1802)Ulrik Chr. v. Schmidten
- (1798-1808)Peder Severin Fønss
- (1808)Arnt Peter Warelmann
- (1808-1810)Fr. Chr. Schønau
- (1810-1835)P. A. Høegh
- (1835-1873)H. C. Høegh
- (1873-1877)Flora Schønau, gift Høegh
- (1877-1878)P. Raae
- (1878- )Hagen Jørgensen
- (1878-1905)C. Ebbensgaard
- ( -1905)Møller
- (1905- )J. L. Laursen
- ( -1960)Karen Laursen
- (1960- )I. C. Lundgaard
- (1997–present)Kristian Brokm*an

== Citations ==
- Danish Manor Houses website
- (in Danish)T. A. Topsøe-Jensen og Emil Marquard (1935) “Officerer i den dansk-norske Søetat 1660-1814 og den danske Søetat 1814-1932". (Officers of the Danish-Norwegian naval service to 1814 and the Danish naval service to 1932) Two volumes.
