= USS Vixen (1813) =

History

United States
- Name: USS Vixen
- Acquired: 1813 by purchase at Savannah, Georgia
- Fate: Captured 25 December 1813

General characteristics
- Type: Brig
- Propulsion: Sail
- Armament: 14 guns

USS Vixen was a 14-gun brig of the United States Navy commissioned in 1813. Vixen was purchased by the U.S. Navy at Savannah, Georgia in 1813. She was captured at sea by the Royal Navy frigate HMS Belvidera on 25 December 1813 while sailing from Wilmington, North Carolina, to Newcastle, Delaware without her armament or stores.
