= Norwegian gunships =

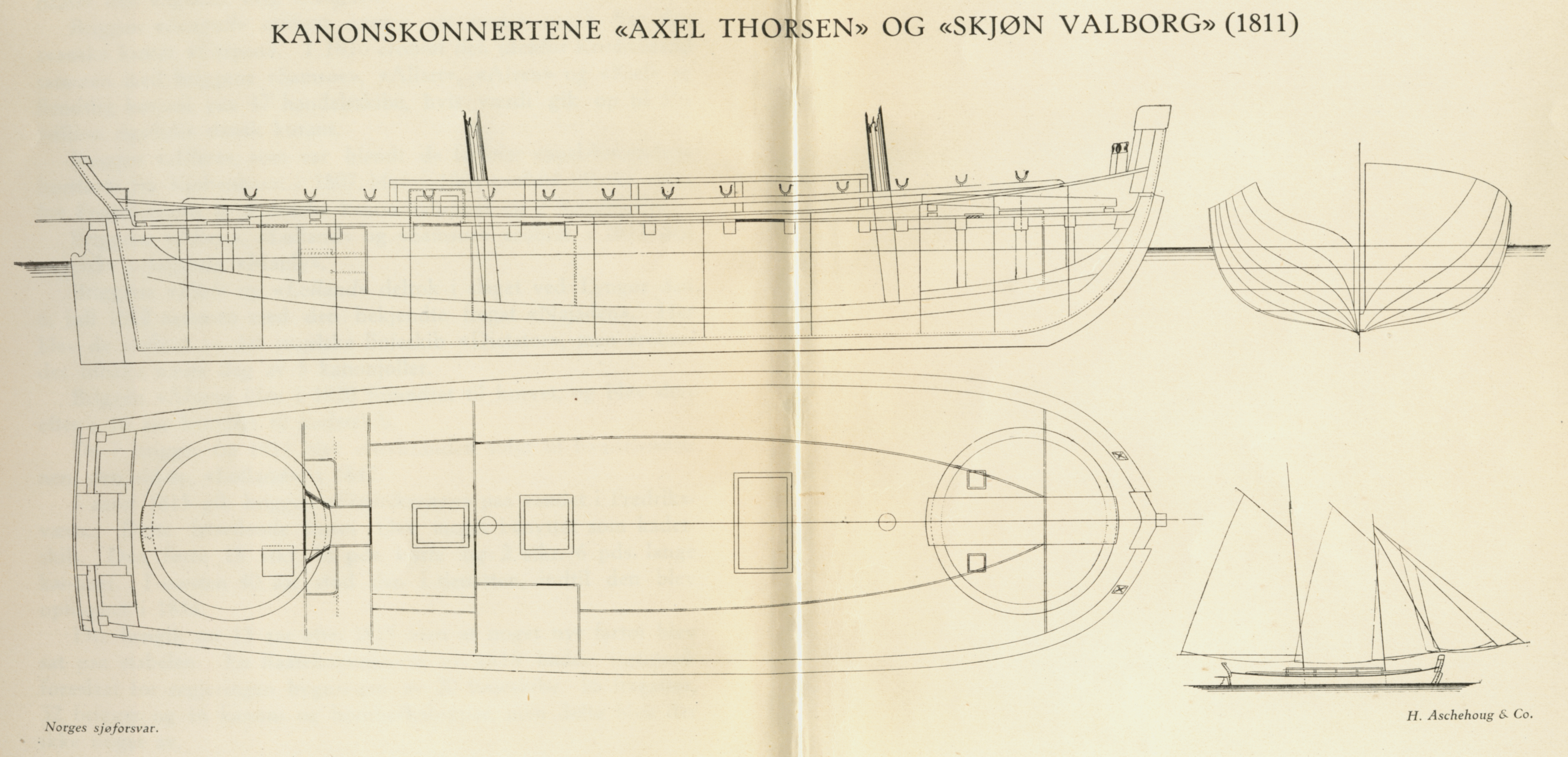
- Plan of the schooners Axel Thorsen and Skiøn Valborg

Class overview
- Name: Norwegian gunships (Norske Kanonskonnert)
- Operators: Dano- Norwegian Navy
- In commission: 1808–1814
- Completed: 10
- Lost: 2
- Retired: 8 (transferred)

Class overview
- Name: Norwegian gun-ship (Norske Kanonskonnert)
- Operators: Norwegian Navy; 1815–1844: ; 1844–1905:
- In commission: 1814–1872
- Active: 8

General characteristics
- Type: Schooner
- Displacement: 70 tons approx.
- Length: 18.3 meters
- Beam: 5.2 meters
- Depth of hold: 1.8 meters
- Complement: 45–50
- Armament: 2 × 24-pounder guns + 2 × 12-pounder carronades + 4 or 6 × 4-pounder howitzers

The Norwegian Gunships were a class of ten schooners that served first in the Royal Dano-Norwegian Navy, and then after 1814 in the Royal Norwegian Navy. The first was launched in 1808 and the last was lost in 1872. Following the near total loss of the Dano-Norwegian navy at the Battle of Copenhagen in September 1807, the ensuing Gunboat War was fought primarily in the relatively confined seas around Denmark. The Danes built their naval strategy on small gunboats that rarely ventured very far from their sheltered harbours.

As the British extended their blockade to the longer Norwegian coastline and up to Russia during the Anglo-Russian War, a different type of vessel became necessary. The result was the Norwegian Gunship, a class of ten pine schooner-rigged vessels all built to the same plan. Each was equipped with 30 oars to permit their crews to row them in calm weather; all were more or less identically armed. These ships had a reputation for seaworthiness, a characteristic much needed in the waters of the Norwegian Sea that was their main area of operations.

The Dano-Norwegian navy stationed eight in Bergen and two in Trondheim, though this is a little deceptive. After the British Royal Navy captured two at the Battle of Silda, the Danes built two more to replace them. The two new schooners received the same names (Thor and Balder) as the lost schooners. Thus there was only a maximum of eight schooners on active duty at any one time. Eight of the schooners were still in service in 1814, all of them based in the Norwegian ports of Bergen and Trondheim. Under the Treaty of Kiel, which provided for the separation of Norway from Denmark, those naval vessels in Norwegian ports automatically transferred to the new Norwegian navy. The schooners therefore continued their careers in the Norwegian navy, with the last serving until 1872.

== The Ten Schooners ==
Name	Builder	Launched	Fate
Norske Kanonskonnert Nr. 1 (renamed Odin 1808)	Herman Brunchorst, Bergen	1808	
Norske Kanonskonnert Nr. 2 (renamed Thor 1808)	Herman Brunchorst, Bergen	1808	Captured by the British 23 July 1810 at the Battle of Silda
Norske Kanonskonnert Nr. 3 (renamed Balder 1810)	Herman Brunchorst, Bergen	1808	Captured by the British 23 July 1810 at the Battle of Silda
Hother	Bergen	10 March 1810	
Valkyrien	Bergen	10 March 1810 (Note: The launch date of 10 August 1810, as recorded in Skibsregister is clearly wrong, as this vessel was in service in July.)	Part of Müller's Finmark Squadron in 1810 Decommissioned c.1819
Nornen	Bergen	10 March 1810	Part of Müller's Finmark Squadron in 1810
Axel Thorsen (Note: Disambiguation: There was a smaller gunboat, a kanonjolle with one 24 pound cannon, of the same name launched in 1808 stationed at Øster Risøer - see Larsen N.A. 1878 - Fra Krigens Tid (1807 - 1814))	Trondheim	28 April 1810	Part of Müller's Finmark Squadron in 1810 Axel Thorsen was used in fisheries protection until 1839, and commercially thereafter. She was lost at sea in the Arctic Ocean in 1872.
Skiøn Valborg	Trondheim	28 May 1810	(Note: Names of the Trondheim-built ships are taken from the epic poem Axel og Valborg following the fortunes of the lovers Axel Thorsen and the Beautiful (Skiont) Valborg)
Thor	Bergen	8 May 1811	(Note: Names of the Bergen-built ships correspond with the Norse Gods Odin, Thor, Baldr and Hother plus Valkyrie and the Norse Fates Norns)
Balder	Bergen	18 June 1811	Seaworthy, Schooner-rigged, and thirty oars. Crew of 50.

== Citations ==
- Individual record cards in Danish for ships of the Danish Royal Navy can sometimes be found on the internet link here. The Danish Naval Museum is building a new website at which details, drawings and models may be available. For individual ships already listed, see here but so far the Norske Kanonskønnerter are not named except for Hother. Design plans for Hother are the only ones that appear to be available on this site.
