= HNoMS Axel Thorsen =

Danish-Norwegian gunship (1810–1863)

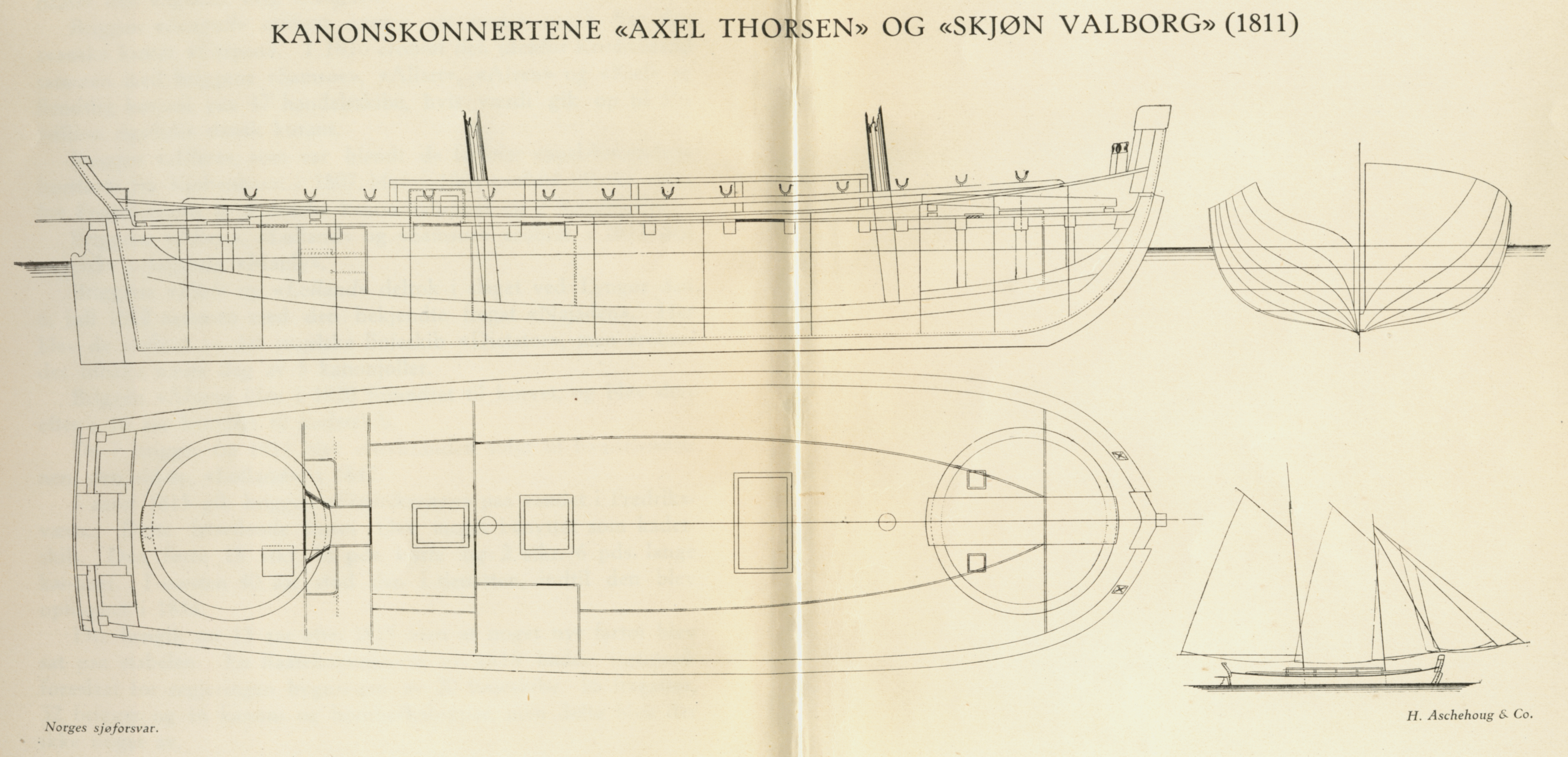
- Plan of the schooners Axel Thorsen and Skiøn Valborg

History

Norway
- Commissioned: 1814
- Fate: Sank, 1872

General characteristics
- Type: Schooner
- Displacement: 70 tons approx.
- Length: 18.3 meters
- Beam: 5.2 meters
- Depth of hold: 1.8 meters
- Complement: 45–50
- Armament: 2 × 24-pounder guns + 2 × 12-pounder carronades + 4 or 6 × 4-pounder howitzers

Axel Thorsen (1810/1814–1863) was a Norske Kanonskonnert built in Trondheim, and launched on 28 April 1810. She was one of ten such ships built in either Bergen or Trondheim for the Danish-Norwegian navy before the end of the Napoleonic Wars (and English Wars) when Norway became independent of Denmark at the Treaty of Kiel in 1814.

== Origin of Name ==
Axel Thorsen is a character in very old Danish folk tales and poetry

== Danish Service ==
Axel Thorsen, along with her sister gunships Nornen and Valkyrien joined Müller's Finmark Squadron in 1810

== Norwegian Service ==
Axel Thorsen was used in fisheries protection until 1839, and commercially thereafter.
In 1864 this ship took part in the Swedish expedition to Spitzbergen led by Baron Nordenskiöld.

== Fate ==
She was lost in the Arctic Ocean off Novaya Zemlya in August 1872.
