= Pomor trade =

Trade between Russia and Norway, 1740–1917

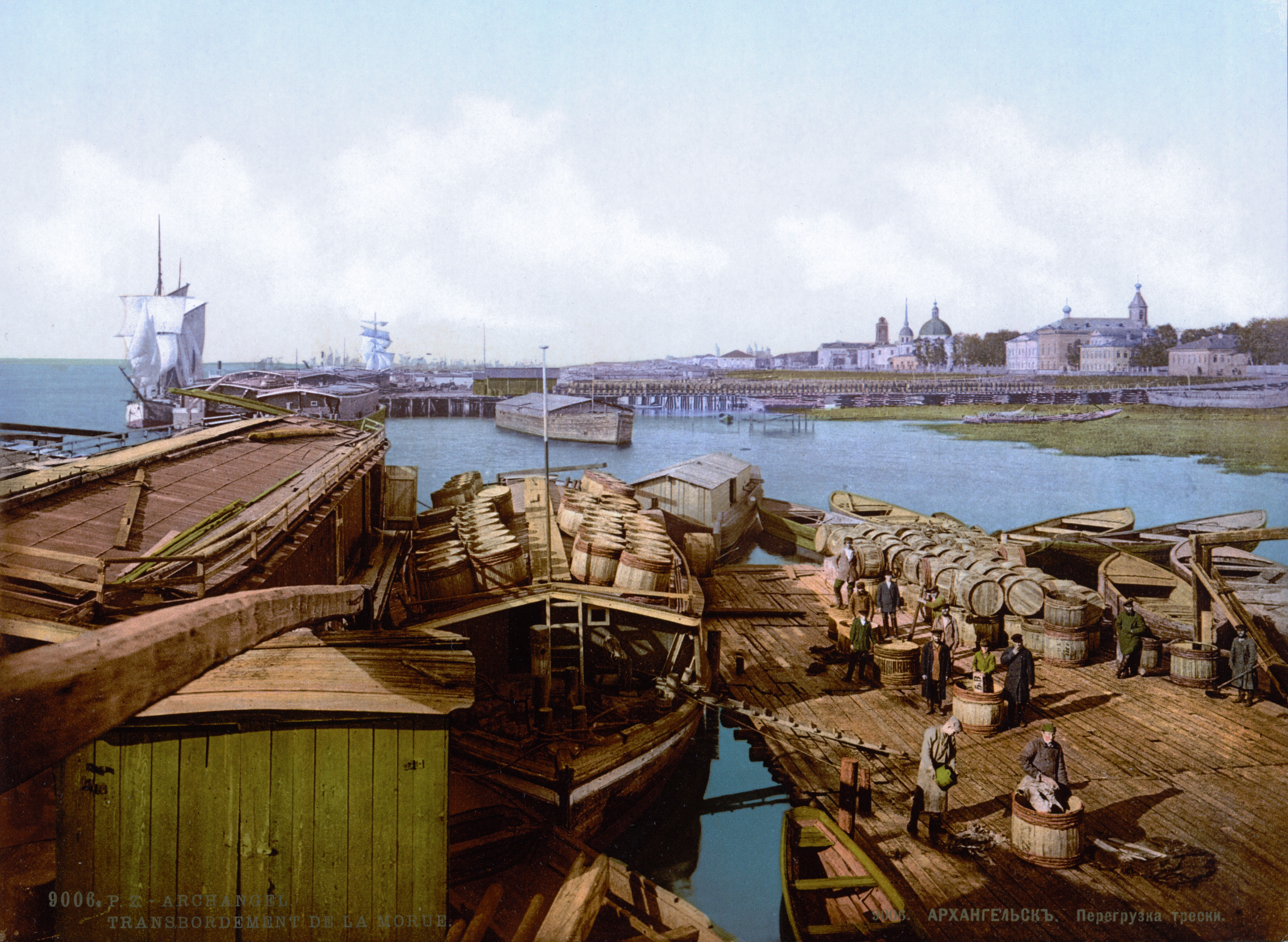
The harbour in Arkhangelsk in 1896, at the peak of the pomor trade.

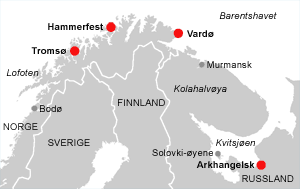
Nordkalotten with the main cities of the pomor trade marked.

The Pomor trade (Norwegian: Pomorhandel, russehandel; Russian: Поморская торговля) was carried out between the Pomors of Northwest Russia and the people along the coast of northern Norway, as far south as Bodø. The trade went on from 1740 until the Bolshevik Revolution in 1917.

The Pomor trade began as a barter trade between people in the area, mainly grain products from Russia and fish from northern Norway. With time it developed into a regular cash trade; in fact the ruble was used as currency in several places in northern Norway. The Pomor trade was of major importance both to the Russians and the Norwegians. It was carried out by Russian Pomors from the White Sea area and the Kola Peninsula who sailed to settlements and places of trade along the coast of northern Norway. The Pomors were skilled traders and sailors, and they also explored areas around the White Sea. In addition to their trade westward, they established a trade route eastward to northwestern Siberia.

== Trade between the countries since the Viking Age ==
Trade between the Russians and the people of northern Norway has a long history, dating back at least to the Viking Age. The Russians of the Principality of Novgorod traded with the Norwegians and Sami people from the Middle Ages until the beginning of the 17th century.

In early summer, the catch from the winter and spring fisheries in northern Norway, mainly stockfish and unsalted dried cod, was bought and shipped south to Trondheim and Bergen by traders. The six weeks from 10 July to 20 August were referred to as the "maggot time", because the fish was difficult to conserve in summer, and there was no market southwards for it. The Pomors recognized this opportunity. They sailed west in the "maggot time" and bought fish, either readily prepared stockfish or salt fish, or fish that they salted themselves in the cargo hold of their vessels. Fish was in demand in Russia due to the Russian Orthodox Church's frequent fasting days, when only fish and vegetarian food was allowed. The fish was shipped to Arkangelsk, which was also a port of shipment for grain products meant for northern Norway. In addition to the vessels from Arkangelsk, Pomor trade was carried out from other harbors along the White Sea, such as Kem and Onega, and also from smaller places such as Suma, Kolisma, Solotiza, Mudjunga, Saroka and Sjuja.

From 1740 the Pomor trade spread in northern Norway, and from about 1770 the Pomors came annually with cheap rye flour (referred to as "Russian flour" in Norway) and also wheat flour. The grain was grown inland around the Volga basin and transported to traders along the White Sea. In northern Norway, the Pomor trade was in certain periods essential for survival. In the 18th century there were several crop failures in Norway. For instance, the price of rye in Bergen increased fivefold over a 30-year period. Thus, the Pomor trade was important for food supply. Fishermen could buy cheap grains and flour, and could sell the catch from the summer fisheries for a good price. It was possible to haggle with the Pomors, the trade had no middlemen to drive up prices, and no taxes or customs fees were paid to the government for the merchandise. In addition to rye and wheat flour, the Pomors carried other food, such as oatmeal, salt, peas, meat and dairy products. Other useful merchandise included iron, timber, pine tar, birch bark, candles, cooking pots, hemp, rope and canvas. They also brought luxury items such as candy, soap, porcelain, and wood carvings. On their way home the Pomors loaded their ships with fish of various sorts, mainly Atlantic cod and dry pollock, but also Atlantic halibut and haddock.

== Regulating the pomor trade ==
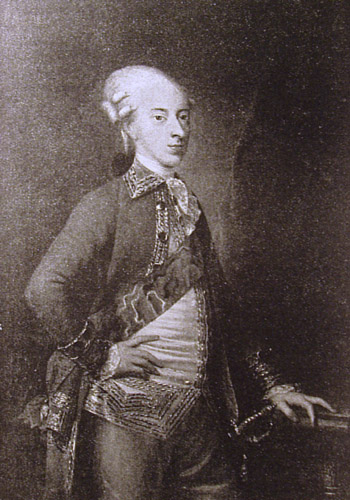
King Christian VII (1749-1808) gave Vardø, Hammerfest and Tromsø status as towns in order to regulate the pomor trade better.

King Haakon V of Norway prohibited foreigners from trading in northern Norway as early as 1316. Until the Protestant Reformation the trade between northern Norway and the Hanseatic League in Bergen was controlled by the Archbishop of Trondheim. In the middle of the 16th century the trade monopoly was transferred to citizens of Bergen and Trondheim. There are reports of Russians trading illegally in northern Norway from the late 17th century. Norwegians trading with Russians could be punished by being denied winter supplies from the (Norwegian) merchants. The trade monopoly was lifted in 1715. Later in the 18th century, the trade was placed under the control of the king and commercial houses of Copenhagen. In 1783 the government decided that northern Norway should be supplied with grain and other merchandise from Russia instead of Denmark.

The trade monopoly was abolished and free trade was introduced in 1789. Vardø and Hammerfest in Finnmark were given town status, and the merchants there gained trade privileges. Vardø grew to be the most important town in Norway regarding the pomor trade. The harbour in Vardø could at times have 100 Russian vessels moored simultaneously, and also had a Russian consulate. Tromsø gained town status and trade privileges in 1794, and was given a monopoly for trading with the pomors in Troms. In the early 19th century, the pomor trade was legalized south to Lofoten. Direct trade with the fishermen was illegal; the pomor trade was reserved for the merchants. This new situation meant a restriction for the fishermen, as until 1789 the Norwegian government had more or less looked the other way when fishermen traded directly with the pomors, but now this became difficult. In 1796, fishermen in Finnmark were allowed to trade directly, but only for one month in the "maggot time". Several merchants in Troms were allowed to trade with the pomors in 1818, and in 1839 the fishermen in Troms could trade directly, but only at four locations in Troms county. In addition, fishermen in Lofoten and Vesterålen were allowed to trade directly.

During the Gunboat War in the early 19th century, the United Kingdom introduced a trade embargo against Denmark-Norway. In this period, the pomor trade proved vital for northern Norway. A decree legalizing direct trade between fishermen and pomors during the Napoleonic Wars was issued in 1809. Several Russian vessels were seized by the British Royal Navy, and thus many vessels did not sail any further than eastern Finnmark. In 1809, during the Anglo-Russian War, the British government established a blockade along Norway's coast to stop the pomor trade and cut the supply lines from Arkangelsk. The White Sea was closed, but quite a few Russian vessels managed to slip through. The Norwegian response to the blockade was to fortify important harbours such as Hammerfest, and in 1810 the Norwegians established a special naval squadron, the Finnmarkseskadren ("The Finnmark squadron"), to protect the pomor trade. (Note: Kaptainløitant Jochum Nicolay Müller, a veteran of the first Battle of Copenhagen in 1801, and captain of Lougen, commanded the squadron.)

== Golden age and discontinuance ==
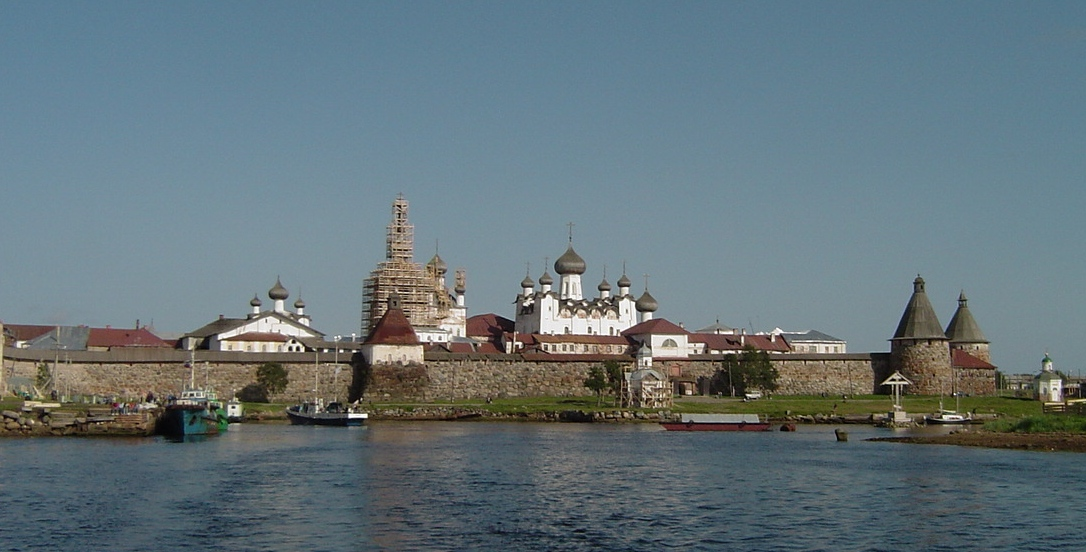
The Solovetsky Monastery owned steamships participating in the Pomor trade.

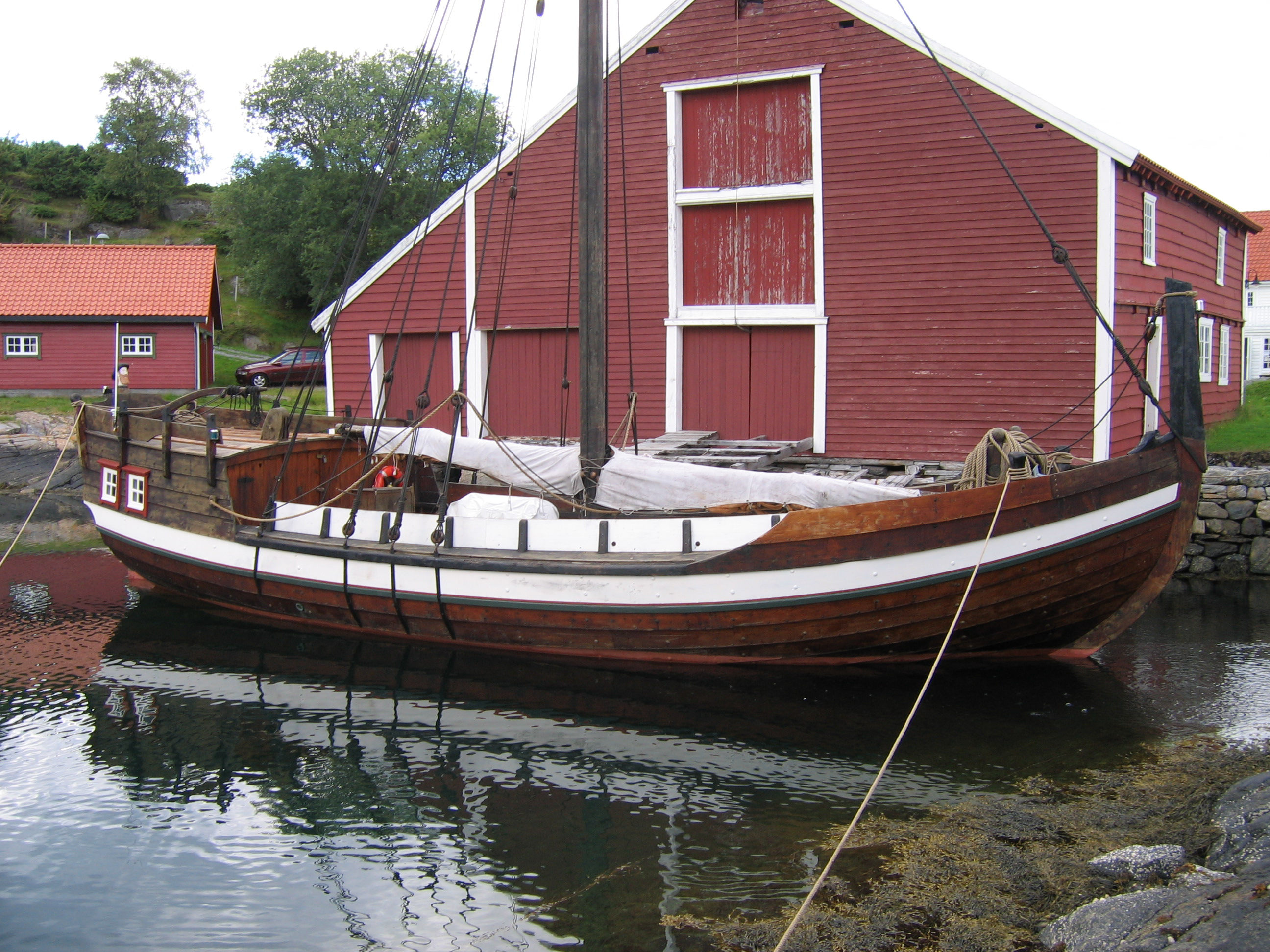
A Norwegian jekt, also used by the Pomors.

Later in the 19th century, northern Norway experienced an economic recovery, with better communications south, especially thanks to a coastal steamship route. The need for grain imports from Russia declined. Yet the Pomor trade increased, reaching its golden age in the last years of the 19th century. Trade privileges were lifted around 1870, and the trade period was extended. In 1874 the trade took place between 15 June and 30 September, which by and large is when the White Sea is ice-free. An important reason for the increase in trade was the legalization of trade directly with the fishermen. The number of trade places were also increased.

The Pomors modernized their vessels in this period. The lodje disappeared in the 1880s, and schooners, jekter and galeases were used. The Solovetsky Monastery of the Solovetsky Islands in the White Sea was the religious center of the Pomors. The monastery possessed large properties around the White Sea, and its commercial interests included boat-building, a saltworks, and fisheries. It owned several steamers participating in the Pomor trade in the early 20th century.

In 1870, 400 Pomor vessels visited Tromsø. Normally, over 300 Pomor vessels with a crew of around 2,000 visited northern Norway annually. In 1900, Russia was Norway's fourth most important trade partner, and rye flour remained the main commodity. After 1910, less flour was traded, the Russians paying for the fish with money instead. During World War I, Russian export regulations were changed, and fear of German submarine attacks limited the Pomor trade. After the Bolshevik Revolution in 1917, the Pomor trade ceased. This had negative effects on the economy of northern Norway, especially for the settlements along the coast. The fishermen no longer had a possibility to sell their summer catch. The occasional Pomor vessel still came to Norway after the trade was officially terminated, the last one arriving in 1929, when Joseph Stalin's collectivisation came into full effect, ending private property rights and persecuting merchants.

== More than trade connections ==
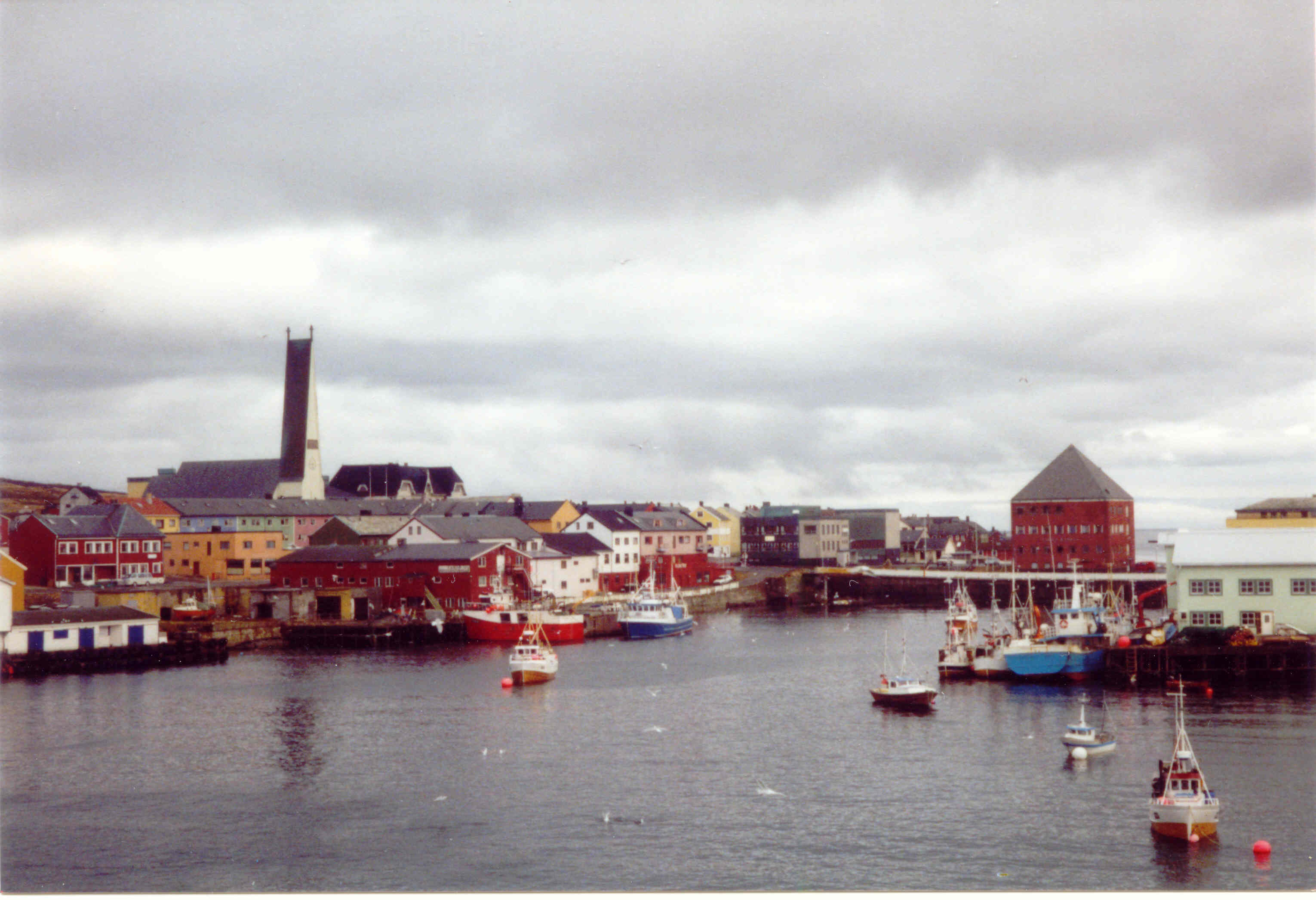
Vardø became the "Pomor capital" of Norway.

Beginning in the 1830s, a pidgin language began taking form between Norwegians and Russians, Russenorsk. A lack of metalinguistic awareness amongst Russenorsk speakers may have led them to believe they were speaking the language of their interlocutor; that is, that Russians believed they were speaking Norwegian and vice versa. As Norwegian merchants began sending their children to school in Arkhangelsk, Russenorsk lost some of its standing.

Many of the large trade places along the coast of northern Norway that sprung up in the 19th century were based upon the Pomor trade. The trade led to other relations; for instance the Russians started a regular steamship service from Arkhangelsk to Vardø in 1875. This service paved the ground for Russian tourism and seasonal workers in Finnmark. The people of northern Norway got an insight into a different culture: drinking tea brewed on a samovar, part-singing, the colourful clothes of Russian women and the hospitality of the Pomor skipper's cabin. Often, the vessels visited the same place year after year, and the Norwegians got to know the skipper and crew. The Russians were highly esteemed in northern Norway, being known as trustworthy.

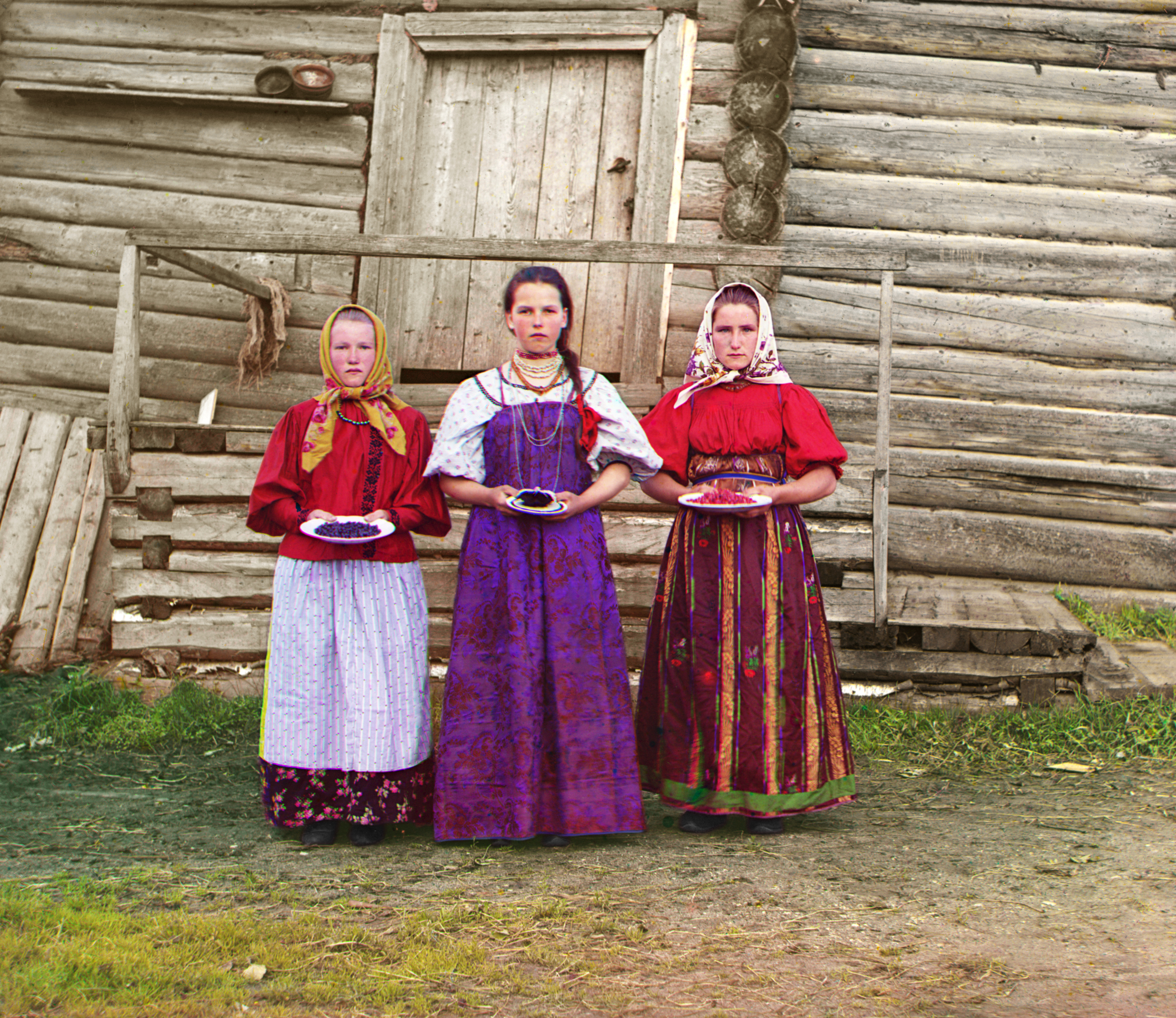
The Pomor women may have been dressed like this. These are young women from Kirilov, south of Arkhangelsk, ca. 1915.
