= HMS Belvidera (1809) =

Frigate of the Royal Navy

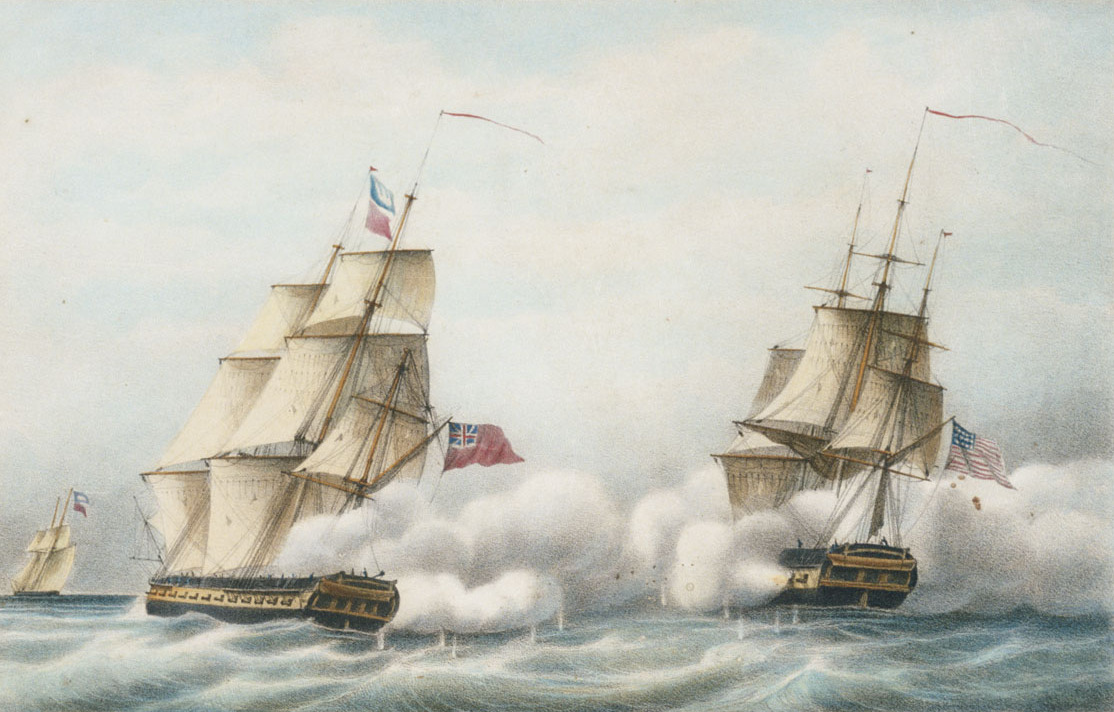
- Belvidera (left) battling and USS President on 23 August 1812

History

United Kingdom
- Name: HMS Belvidera
- Ordered: 28 September 1808
- Builder: Deptford Dockyard
- Laid down: December 1808
- Launched: 23 December 1809
- Fate: Receiving ship, Portsmouth, 1860; Sold for breaking, 1906

General characteristics
- Type: Apollo-class fifth-rate frigate
- Tons burthen: 94353/94 (as designed)
- Length: 145 ft (44 m) (gundeck); 121 ft 9 3/8 in (37.119 m) (gundeck)
- Beam: 38 ft 2 in (11.63 m)
- Draught: 13 ft 3 in (4.04 m)
- Propulsion: Sail
- Sail plan: Full-rigged ship
- Complement: 264
- Armament: Upper deck:26 × 18-pounder guns; QD: 2 × 9-pounder guns + 10 × 32-pounder carronades; Fc: 2 × 9-pounder guns + 4 × 32-pounder carronades

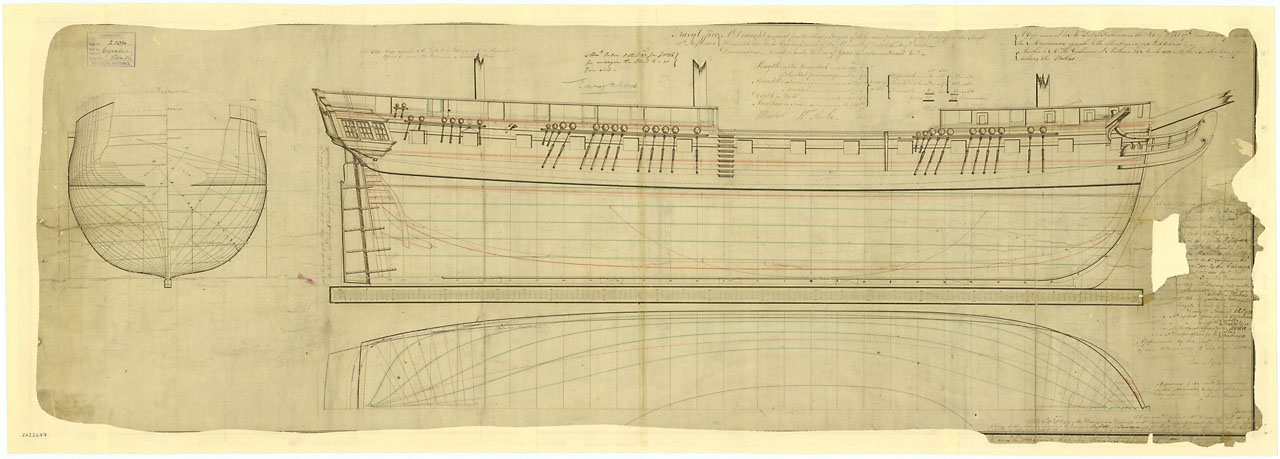
Plan of an Apollo-class frigate dated 1803

HMS Belvidera was a 36-gun Apollo-class frigate of the Royal Navy built in Deptford Dockyard in 1809. She saw action in the Napoleonic Wars and the War of 1812 and continued a busy career at sea into the middle of the 19th century. In 1846 she was reduced to harbour service, in 1860 she became a receiving ship, and she was finally disposed of in 1906.

== Service ==
Belvidera was commissioned in January 1810 under Captain Charles Dashwood. In March, Captain Richard Byron replaced Dashwood.

On 22 July 1810, Belvidera and Nemesis, Captain William Ferris, were sailing close to the shore of Studtland, Norway. That evening a boat from Belvedera sighted three Danish gun-vessels in a large bay. Next day, seven boats from the two frigates attacked the Danes. Two of the Danish vessels, Balder and Thor, commanded by Lieutenants Dahlreup and Rasmusen, were schooner-rigged. Each mounted two long 24-pounders and six 6-pounder howitzers and had a crew of 45 men. The third gun-vessel carried one long 24-pounder and a crew of 25 men. The British captured both Balder and Thor without suffering any casualties, though the Danes lost four men killed. The remaining vessel, Gunboat No. 5, ran up a fiord where her crew abandoned her; the British then burnt her.

In 1811, Belvidera became the flagship of Admiral Herbert Sawyer on the Halifax station in Nova Scotia.

=== Belvidera and USS Constitution ===
Belvidera took part in one of the earliest actions of the War of 1812 when she encountered the American frigates USS President, USS Congress and USS United States on 23 June 1812, five days after the war had started. Belvidera had been shadowing Marengo, an American privateer captained by John Ordronaux. The crew of Belvidera were not aware that war had been declared and after returning fire they managed to evade their pursuers during the night. Belvidera's course during the fight had led the Americans away from a British convoy bound from Jamaica, allowing the convoy to escape attack. Belvidera arrived in Halifax on 27 June with three prizes that she captured on the way.

On 16 July 1812, Belvidera was part of a British squadron that gave chase to USS Constitution, which was on her way from Chesapeake Bay to New York City. In the very light winds, both sides put out boats to tow the ships. Constitution gained an advantage by using her anchors to pull herself about four miles ahead of Belvidera. Byron then copied the manoeuvre of Constitution and managed to bring the two ships within gunshot. They exchanged fire as a light breeze came up, and by daylight on 19 July Constitution, being newly out of port, was able to escape.

=== Prize-taking ===
For the remainder of the war, Belvidera was active in the blockade of the American coast, capturing many American merchant ships and privateers. Between 1 June 1812 and 14 December 1812, Belvidera captured a number of merchant vessels:

- brig Malcolm, of 197 tons, sailing from Madeira to Portland, carrying dollars and wine (24 June);
- ship Fortune, of 317 tons, sailing from Cape de Verde to Newbury Port, carrying salt (25 June).
- brig Minerva, of 256 tons, sailing from Liverpool to Boston with coals and salt (6 July; with Africa, Aeolus and Shannon);
- ship Oronoko, of 427 tons, sailing from Lisbon to New York, in ballast (11 July; with Africa, Shannon, Aeolus and Guerriere);
- brig Hare, of 246 tons, sailing from Naples to Boston, with brandy, silks, oil, &c. (1 August); and,
- schooner Friendship, of 98 tons, sailing from Charleston to New York, carrying cotton (11 September). Also, they captured the
- ship Eleanor (23 July). (Note: First-class shares of the prize money were worth £90 12s 10 1/4d (Minerva), £97 16s 7 1/2d (Oroonoko) and £44 4s 11 3/4d (Eleanor). Sixth-class shares, those of an ordinary seamen, were worth 15s 7 1/2d, 17s 1 1/2d and 7s 10 3/4d.)

Belvidera, Aeolus, Africa, Shannon and Guerriere were among the vessels that shared in the proceeds of the capture of USS Nautilus on 16 July. At the time of her capture she mounted 16 guns, had crew of 106 men and was under the command of Lieutenant William M. Crane. (Note: A first-class share of the prize money was worth £68 15s 11d; a sixth-class share was worth 12s 0 3/4d.)

On 21 August Belvidera captured the U.S. privateer 7-gun schooner Bunker's Hill, with 72 men. (Note: A first-class share of the prize money was worth £114 16s 2d; a sixth-class share was worth £1 3s 10 3/4d.) On 10 September Belvidera detained Citizen. Two days later Belvidera captured the American schooner Hiram.

Belvidera recaptured the Post Office Packet Service packet Nocton on 5 January 1813. The USS Essex had captured Nocton 11 December 1812. Belvidera sent Nocton into Bermuda. After undergoing some refitting Nocton arrived back at Falmouth on 17 March.

On 8 February 1813, nine boats and 200 men of Maidstone, Belvidera, Junon and Statira, which were at anchor in Lynhaven Bay, chased and captured the letter of marque schooner Lottery, of 225 tons, and pierced for 16 guns though only carrying six 12-pounder carronades. She had a crew 28 men and was sailing from Baltimore to Bordeaux with a cargo of coffee, sugar, and logwood. In the engagement the British had six men wounded, one of whom later died, but Belvidera herself suffered no casualties. The Americans suffered 19 men wounded, including their captain, John Southcomb, before they struck. Southcomb died of his wounds and his body was taken ashore.

A week later Lottery convoyed several prizes to Bermuda. The British took Lottery into service as the 16-gun schooner Canso.

On March 13, 1813 Belvidera arrived on the Delaware Bay anchoring adjacent to the Cape Henlopen Lighthouse. The following month, on April 7 and 8, Belvidera and Poictiers bombarded the port town of Lewes, Delaware for 22 hours after their demands for provisions and water were refused.

Belvidera was among the numerous British warships that shared in the capture of the American ship St. Michael on 10 February. On 25 September 1813, Belvidera, Statira and Morgiana were in company when they captured Ambition.

On 19 December Jaseur and Niemen captured Rising States. Belvidera and Narcissus shared in the proceeds of the capture by agreement with Jaseur. Then on Christmas Day, Belvidera captured the schooner USS Vixen, which was attempting to get from Wilmington, North Carolina, to Newcastle, Delaware. The US had purchased Vixen at Savannah, Georgia, in 1813 but when Belvidera captured her she had not yet received her armament of 14 guns nor naval stores.

On 7 March 1814, Belvidera, Endymion and Rattler captured the American privateer Mars. Mars was armed with 15 guns and had a crew of 70 men. A later report has them destroying her on 10 March. Belvidera was also among the vessels sharing in the proceeds of the capture of the brigs Christina and Massasoit on 3 and 14 March.

On 21 April 1814, Belvidera captured the US ship New Zealander, of 256 tons, armed with six guns and with a crew of 17 men. She was sailing from the Marquesas to Philadelphia carrying a cargo of spermaceti oil. New Zealander, a prize to USS Essex, had departed Valparaiso for the United States and was only one day out of New York when Belvidera captured her. In addition Belvidera captured the following American vessels:

- schooner Nancy and Polly, carrying shingles (19 June);
- sloop Alonzo (22 June);
- sloop Hunter, of 60 tons and nine men, sailing from New Burn to New York, carrying tar and turpentine (24 June).

== Post-war ==
At the end of 1814, Belvidera was decommissioned at Portsmouth. She was relaunched on 26 September 1817, having been refitted. She made numerous cruises to the Mediterranean, Portugal, Madeira, and the West Indies. In 1834 she took troops to St Kitts and then on a second trip, to Trinidad. In October 1846 Belvidera was fitted at Portsmouth as a store depot.

Extract from Tobermory, Isle of Mull Old Parish Records dated 23 August 1847 :- Robert Kerslake Royal Marine on board H M Ship Belvidera at Tobermory Bay and Ann McQuarrie servant or nurse to a Captain Wellington of H M Ship Belvidara Stationed at Tobermory were married by Revd David Ross Minister of Tobermory.

== Fate ==
Belvidera was fitted as a receiving ship in between August and November 1852, and she served in that role at Portsmouth until 1890.She was sold on 10 July 1906 to J.B. Garham for £1,800.
