= Jochum Nicolay Müller =

Norwegian naval officer

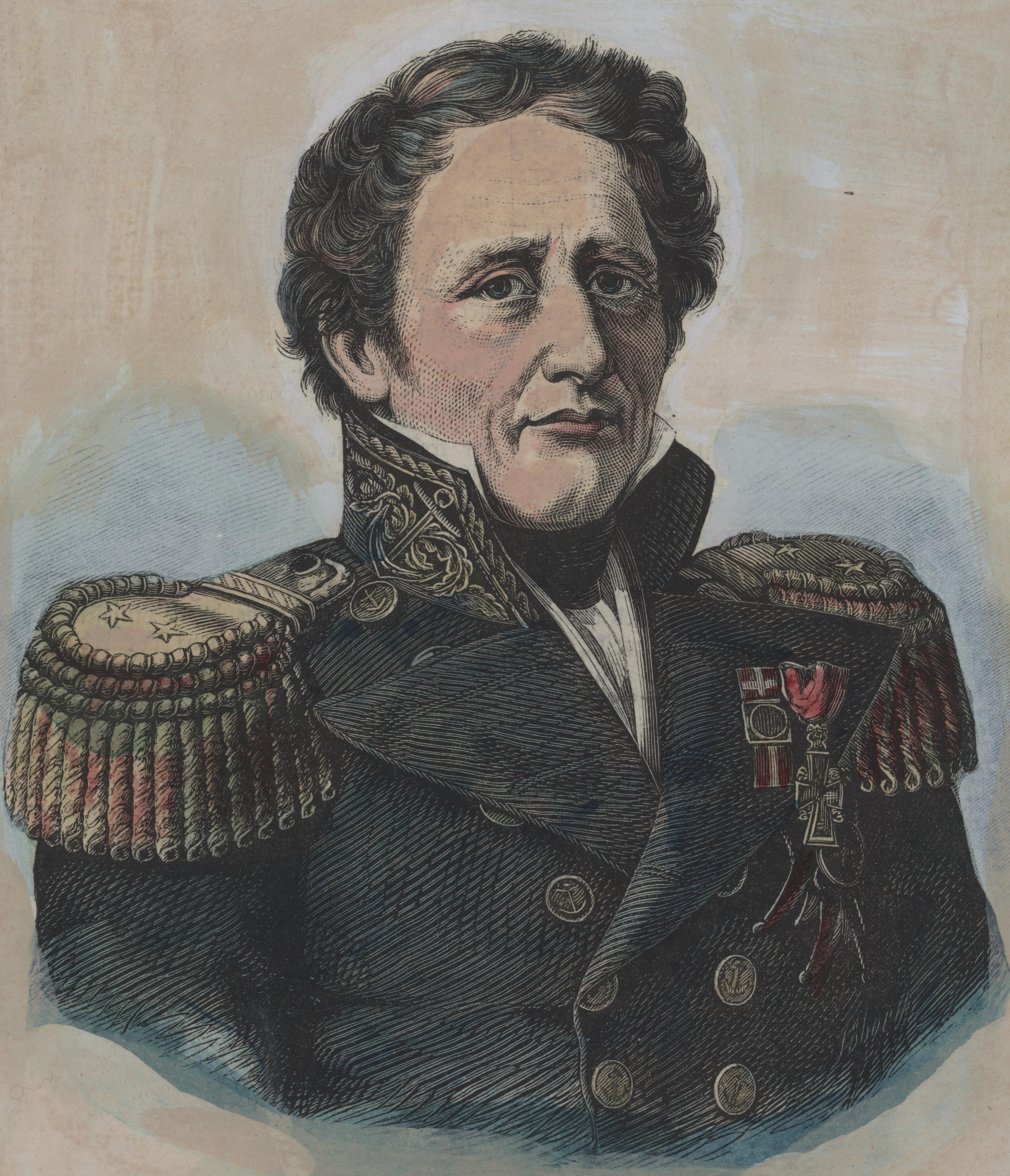
- Born: 1 February 1775; Trondheim
- Died: 2 January 1848 (aged 75); Christiana, Norway (modern name Oslo)
- Burial place: Oslo, Norway
- Military career
- Allegiance: Denmark-Norway; Norway
- Branch: Royal Danish Navy; Royal Norwegian Navy
- Service years: 1789–1841
- Rank: Vice Admiral
- Conflicts: Battle of Copenhagen (1801); Battle of Copenhagen (1807); Finnmark Squadron

Vice-Admiral Jochum Nicolay Müller (1 February 1775 – 2 January 1848) was a Norwegian naval officer. As a midshipman, he excelled at mathematics. As a junior lieutenant he met Horatio Nelson, and as a captain commanded the Finnmark squadron. He finally rose to the rank of Vice Admiral in the independent Royal Norwegian Navy.

== Career ==
J N Müller joined the navy as a volunteer cadet in 1789, becoming a midshipman four years later. At the naval academy he won the Gerner medal for excellence in mathematics in 1795 and graduated as a junior lieutenant in 1796. He was second in command of the cutter Forsvar on the Norwegian coast, before undertaking a cruise to the Danish West Indies on the frigate Iris. In April 1801, as war between Denmark-Norway and Britain approached, he was in command of the small gunboat Hajen (the heron).

=== Battle of Copenhagen (1801) ===
During the Battle of Copenhagen (1801), the little Hajen was posted beside the blockship Dannebrog with its crew of 357 men. The Danish defence line withstood nearly four hours of intense bombardment from the British fleet, returning fire in good measure, until the Dannebrog had lost one third of its complement, caught fire, and exploded. Hajen received a good proportion of the shots aimed at the Dannebrog and eventually had to strike. Müller was taken prisoner and conveyed to Nelson's flagship, where he came face to face with Horatio Nelson. Müller described the admiral as a small, gaunt man with a strong presence, wearing a green Russian-style (kalmyk) overcoat and a three-cornered hat.

The resolute, near crazy, defence had made a deep impression on the attackers. A British captain vouchsafed to Müller that never had the British navy experienced such a warm reception - not from the Dutch, the French or the Spanish! Later that year he served in the cadet training ship Fredericksværn and was promoted to senior lieutenant in 1802. In 1806, as captain of the pilot boat Allart. he sailed to Saint Petersburg where the ship was donated to the Russian navy. There Müller met Czar Alexander I when the latter came aboard.

=== Second Battle of Copenhagen (1807) ===
Müller was in command of the gunboat Flensborg in September 1807, when the British seized it and many other vessels after the Danes capitulated following the second Battle of Copenhagen. Flensborg did not make it back to Britain; she was lost in the storm in the Kattegat.

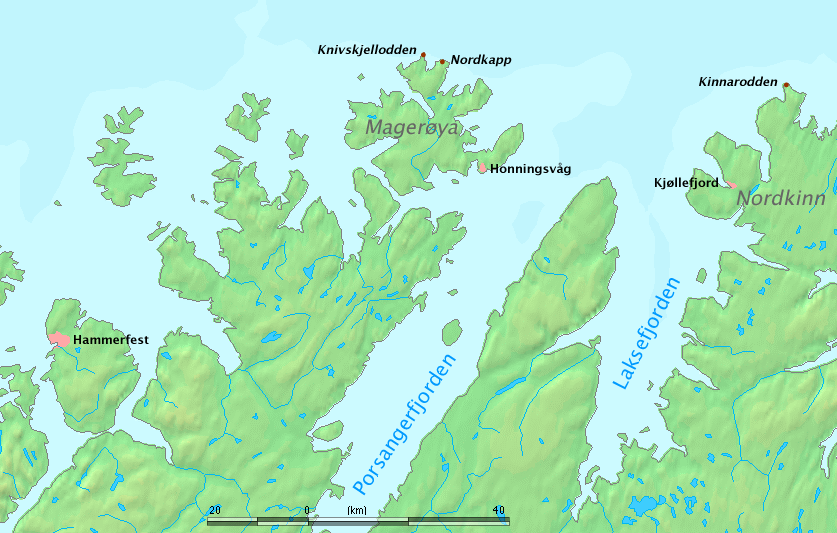
Northern Norway showing Hammerfest, North Cape and the Nordkinn

=== Finnmark 1810 and 1811 ===
After a spell in 1808–1810 in command of a gunboat division on the Norwegian border with Sweden, Müller was promoted to captain and given command of the brig Lougen, which was to sail with HDMS Langeland to the North Cape of Norway together with three newly completed Norwegian Gunships. As commander of this Finnmark Squadron in 1810, he re-established Norway's control of the trade route to northern Russia, which British warships had interdicted. He was also instrumental in rebuilding the harbour defences at Hammerfest. While she was returning to Trondheim with eleven large ships taken as prizes in September, Lougen ran aground on a reef south of Bodø and was nearly lost.

In 1811 Müller was again in command of the Finnmark squadron, which in that year comprised four Norwegian gunships and five other armed vessels - but no brigs. Much of his work then consisted in improving the very elementary maps of the area, and charting the seaways around North Cape and the Nordkinn Peninsula.

Following his sojourn in the far north, Müller was severely affected by arthritis and on sick leave for much of 1812. When he returned to duty he was responsible in August 1813 for successfully escorting a regiment of soldiers over the Great Belt to the island of Langeland despite the British blockade.

=== After the war ===
One year after the Treaty of Kiel and the short war with Sweden, Müller sought release from his duties to the Danish King Frederick VI, who was loath to lose such an effective officer. The King gave Müller permission to stay in Norway for two years, but this assignment was later made permanent.

In 1841 Müller reached the rank of Vice-Admiral in the Royal Norwegian Navy. He died on 2 January 1848 and is buried in Oslo, then known as Christiana.
