= Gostiny Dvor (disambiguation) =

Gostiny dvor (Russian: Гостиный двор) is a historic Russian term for an indoor market or shopping centre.

The term Gostiny Dvor may refer to:

- Arkhangelsk Gostiny Dvor, a network of fortified depots built in Arkhangelsk, Russia
- Great Gostiny Dvor, the oldest and largest shopping centre in St. Petersburg, Russia
  - Gostiny Dvor (Saint Petersburg Metro), a station on the Nevsko-Vasileostrovskaya line near the shopping centre
- Kostroma Gostiny Dvor, the best preserved complex of provincial Neoclassical trading arcades in Russia
- Moscow Gostiny Dvor, the Old Merchant Court in Moscow, Russia
- Hostynnyi Dvir (Kyiv), the Neoclassical trade center in Kyiv, Ukraine
