= Dvor =

Dvor may refer to:

Places in Bosnia and Herzegovina:

- Dvor, Visoko, a settlement in the Municipality of Visoko

Places in Croatia:

- Dvor, Croatia, a town and a municipality in Croatia

Places in Slovenia:

- Dvor, Ljubljana, a settlement in the City Municipality of Ljubljana
- Dvor, Šmarje pri Jelšah, a settlement in the Municipality of Šmarje pri Jelšah
- Dvor, Šmartno pri Litiji, a settlement in the Municipality of Šmartno pri Litiji
- Dvor, Žužemberk, a settlement in the Municipality of Žužemberk
- Dvor pri Bogenšperku, the name for Dvor, Šmartno pri Litiji from 1953 to 1995
- Dvor pri Polhovem Gradcu, a settlement in the Municipality of Dobrova–Polhov Gradec
- Dravski Dvor, a settlement in the Municipality of Miklavž na Dravskem Polju
- Pesniški Dvor, a settlement in the Municipality of Pesnica
- Stari Dvor, Radeče, a settlement in the Municipality of Radeče

== See also ==
- DVOR
- Gostiny Dvor (disambiguation), a historic Russian term for an indoor market, or shopping center
