= Gostiny dvor =

Historical Russian indoor market or shopping centre

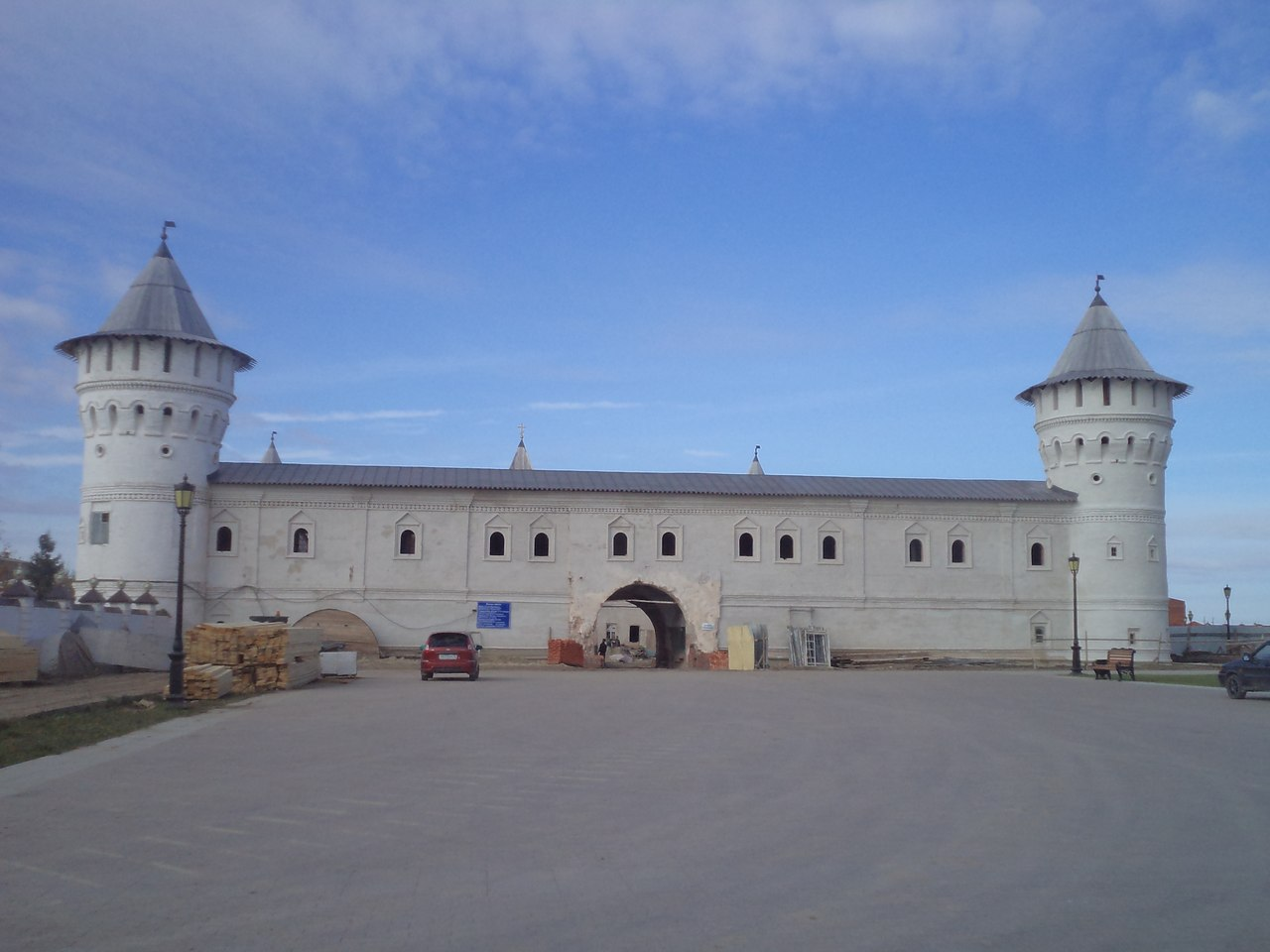
The Gostiny Dvor in Tobolsk, Siberia (1703–08)

Gostinyi dvor (Russian: гостиный двор, IPA: [ɡɐˈsʲtʲinɨj ˈdvor]) is a historic Russian term for an indoor market or shopping centre. Often translated as "guest court" or "merchant yard," these terms are only partially accurate. Originating as simple clusters of stalls, these structures evolved into trading complexes, often fortified, for the "gosti" (elite traveling merchants), combining wholesale warehouses, retail shops, and secure living quarters, similar in function to the Venetian fondaco or the Middle Eastern caravanserai. Present in almost every large Russian town, many such structures were rebuilt from the late 18th to the early 19th century as monumental examples of Neoclassical architecture.

== Notable examples ==
=== Saint Petersburg ===
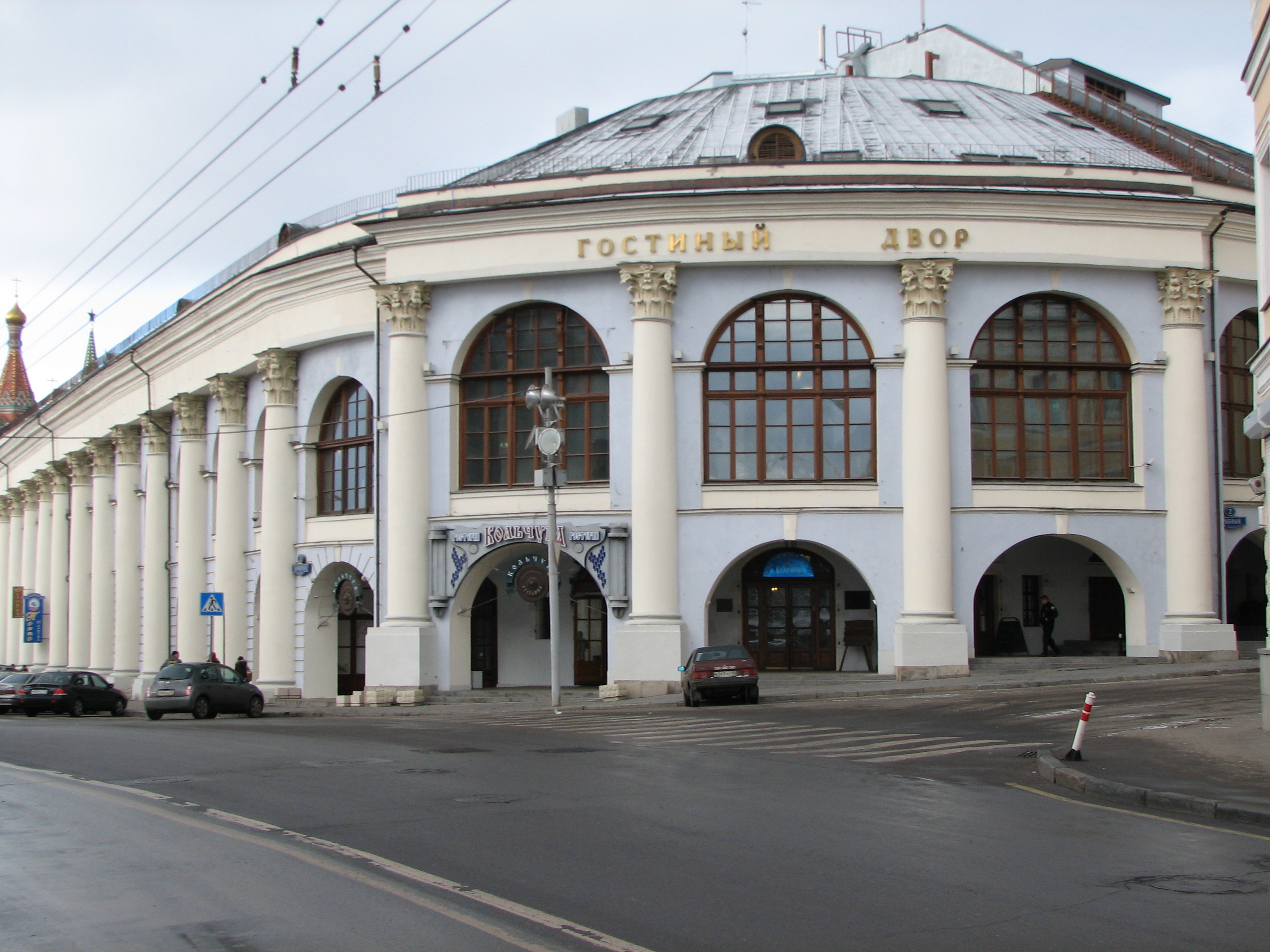
The Old Gostiny Dvor in Moscow

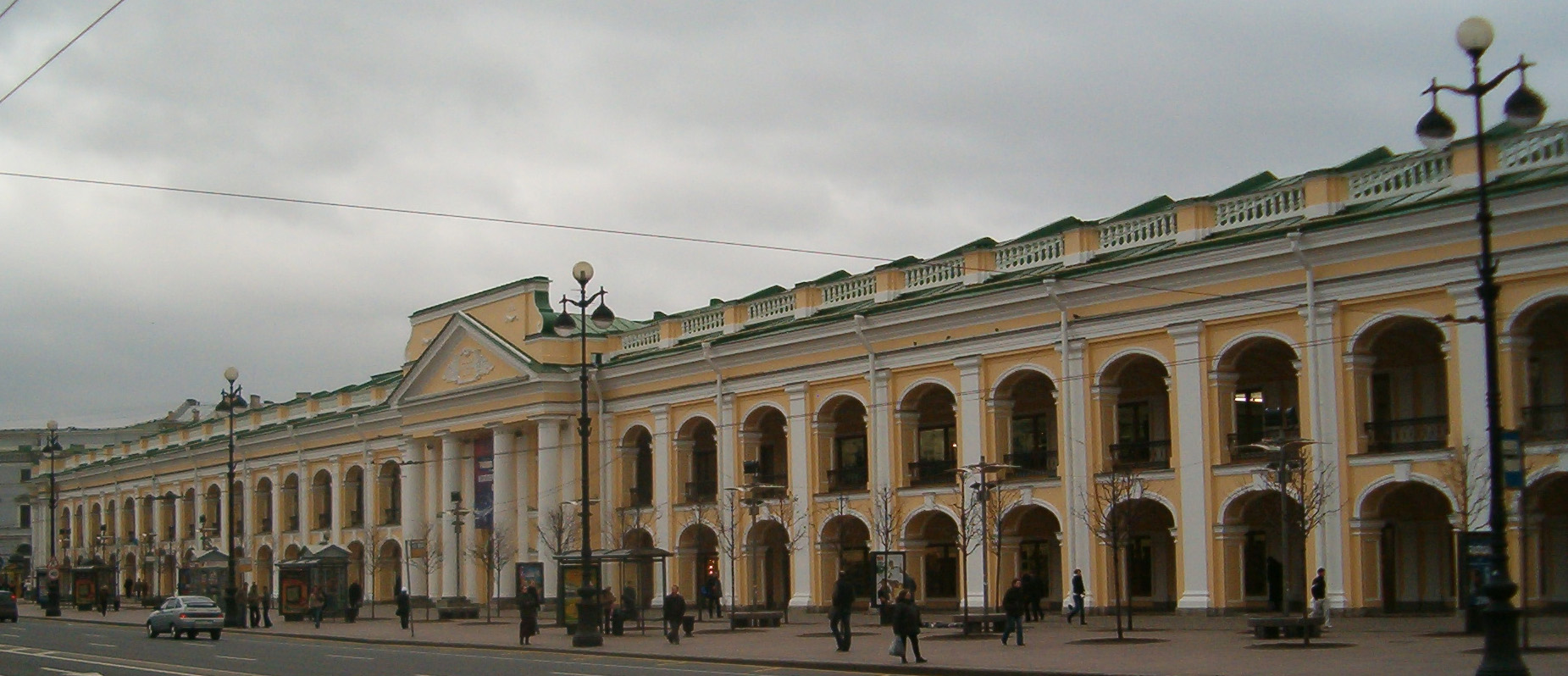
The Great Gostiny Dvor in St. Petersburg

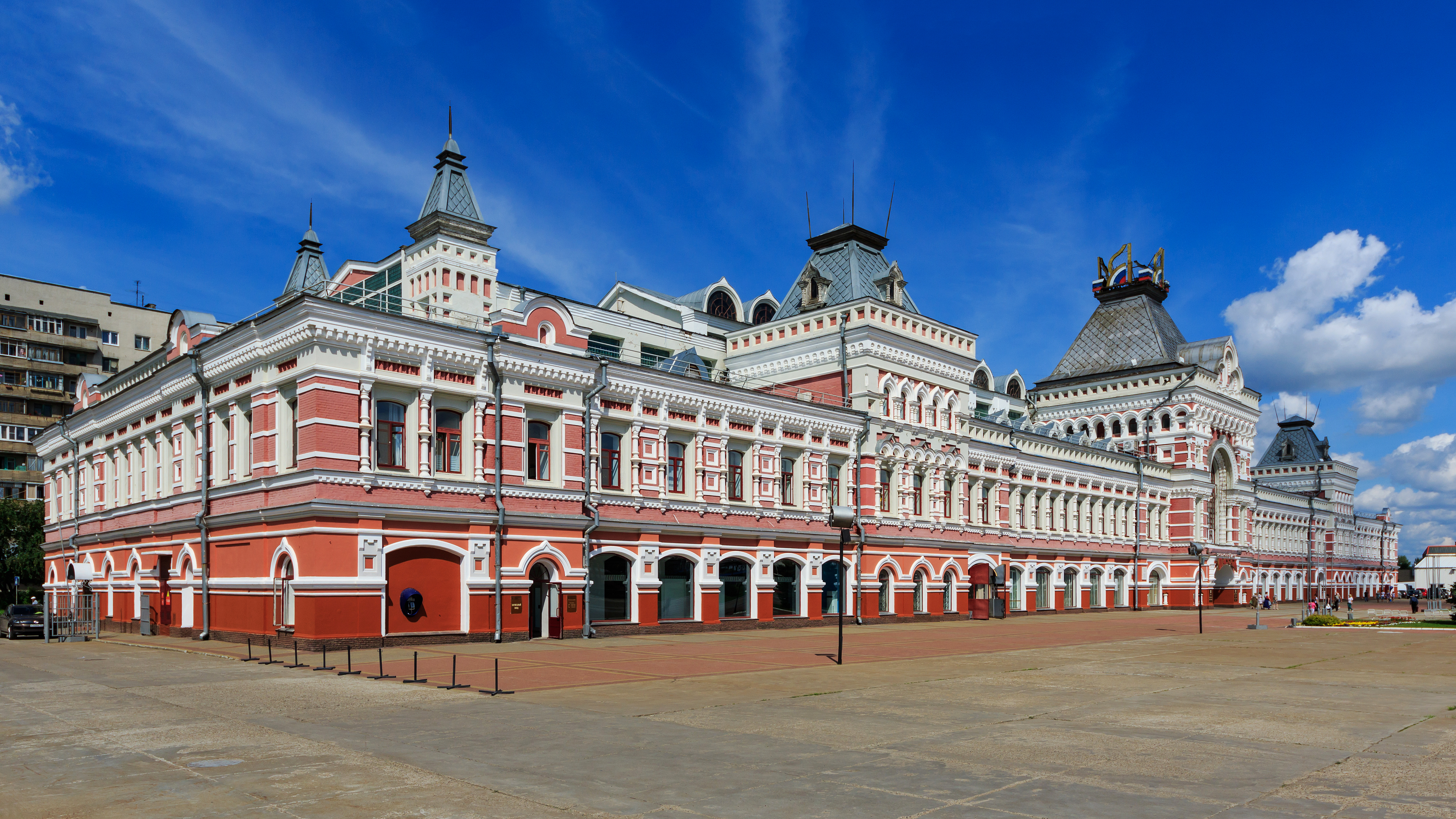
Gostiny dvor of the Nizhny Novgorod Fair

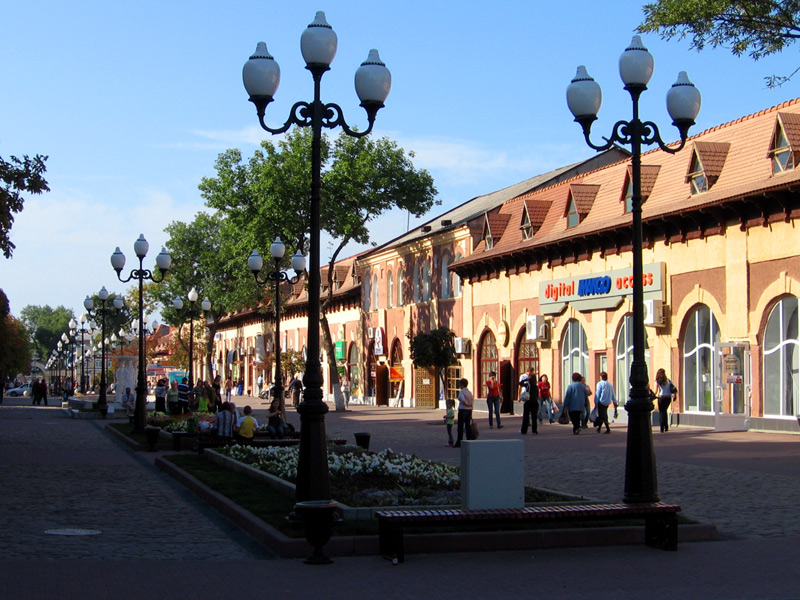
Gostiny dvor in Yeysk (1852–1854)

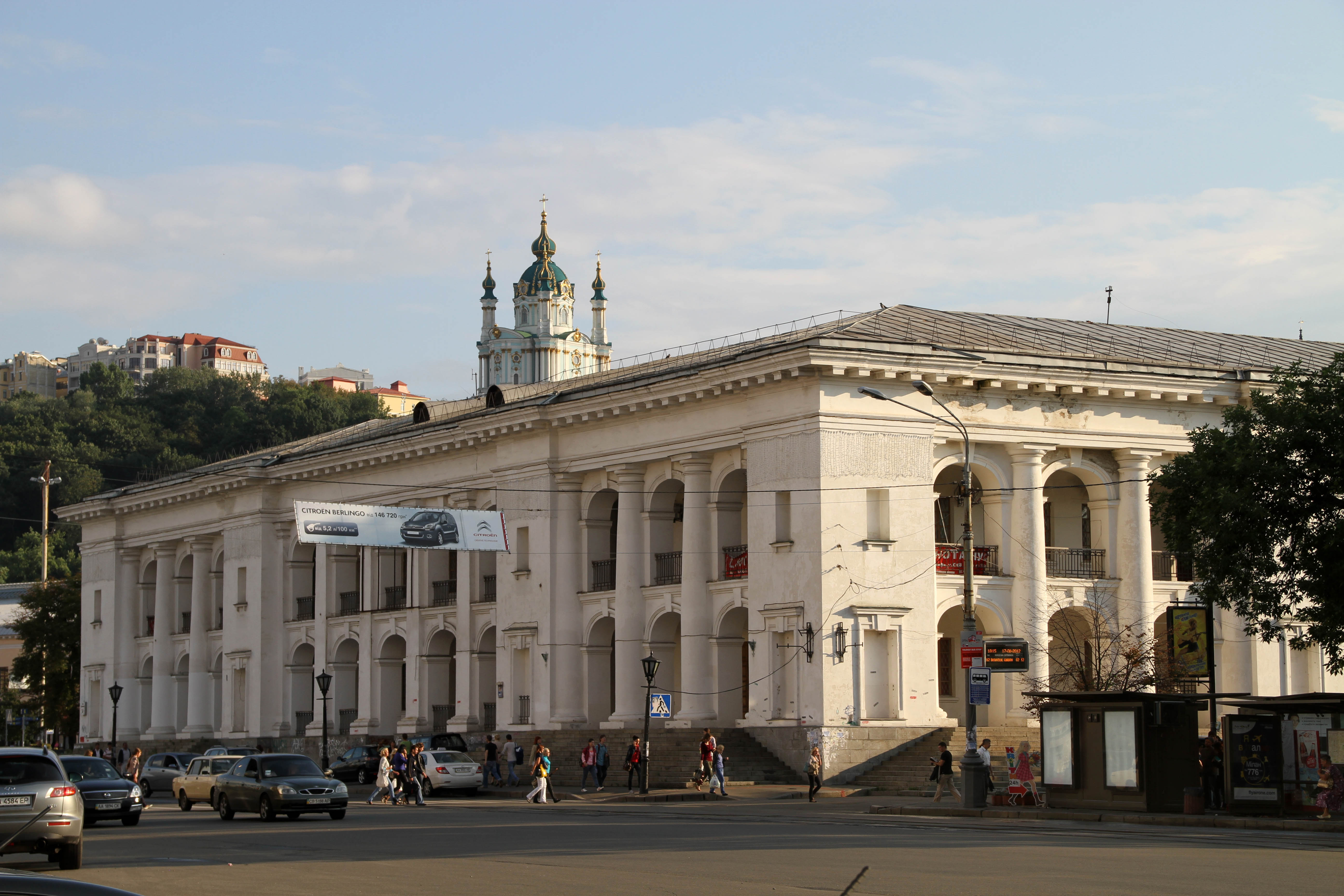
Gostiny Dvor in Kyiv

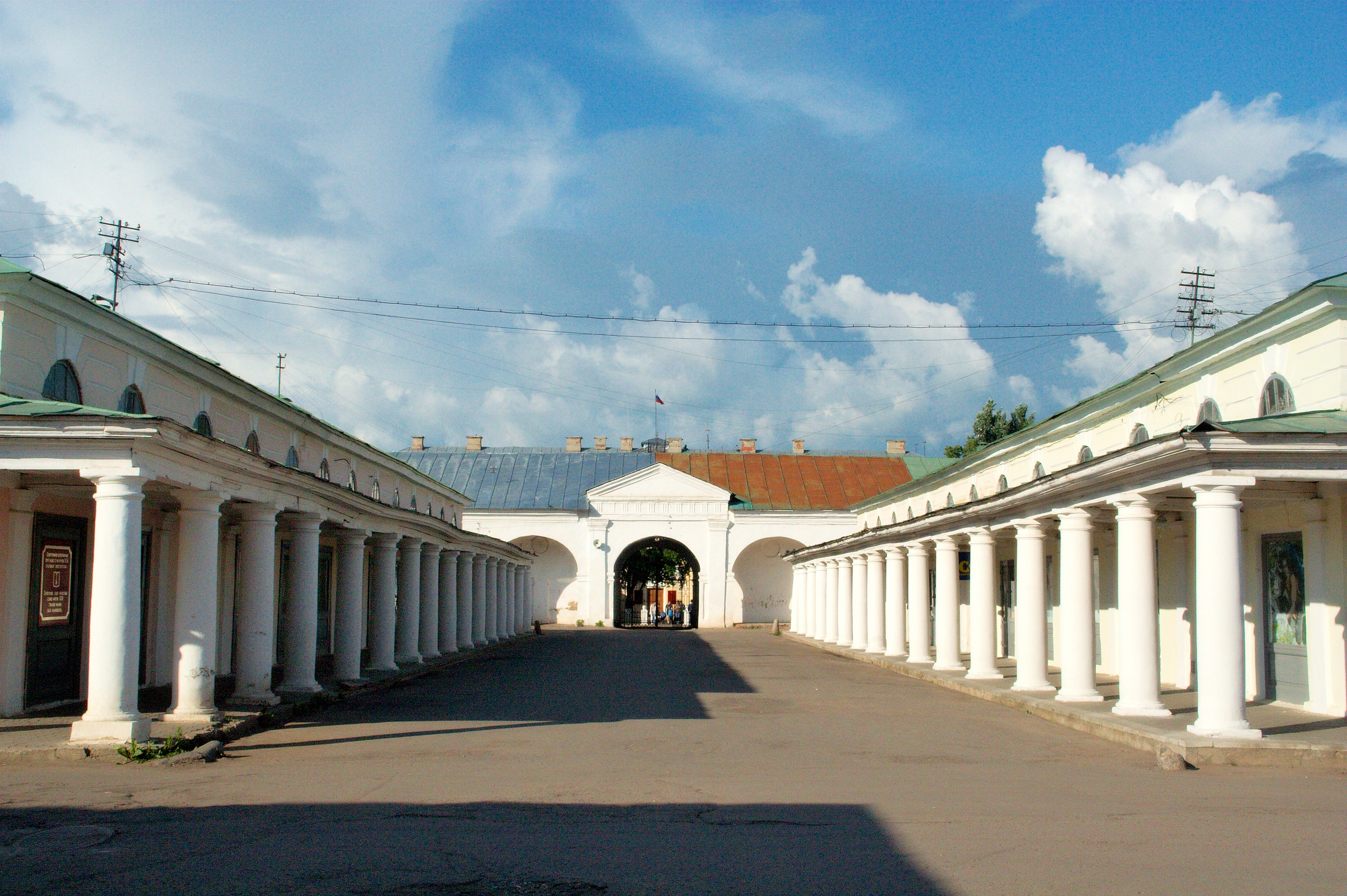
The Kostroma Gostiny Dvor

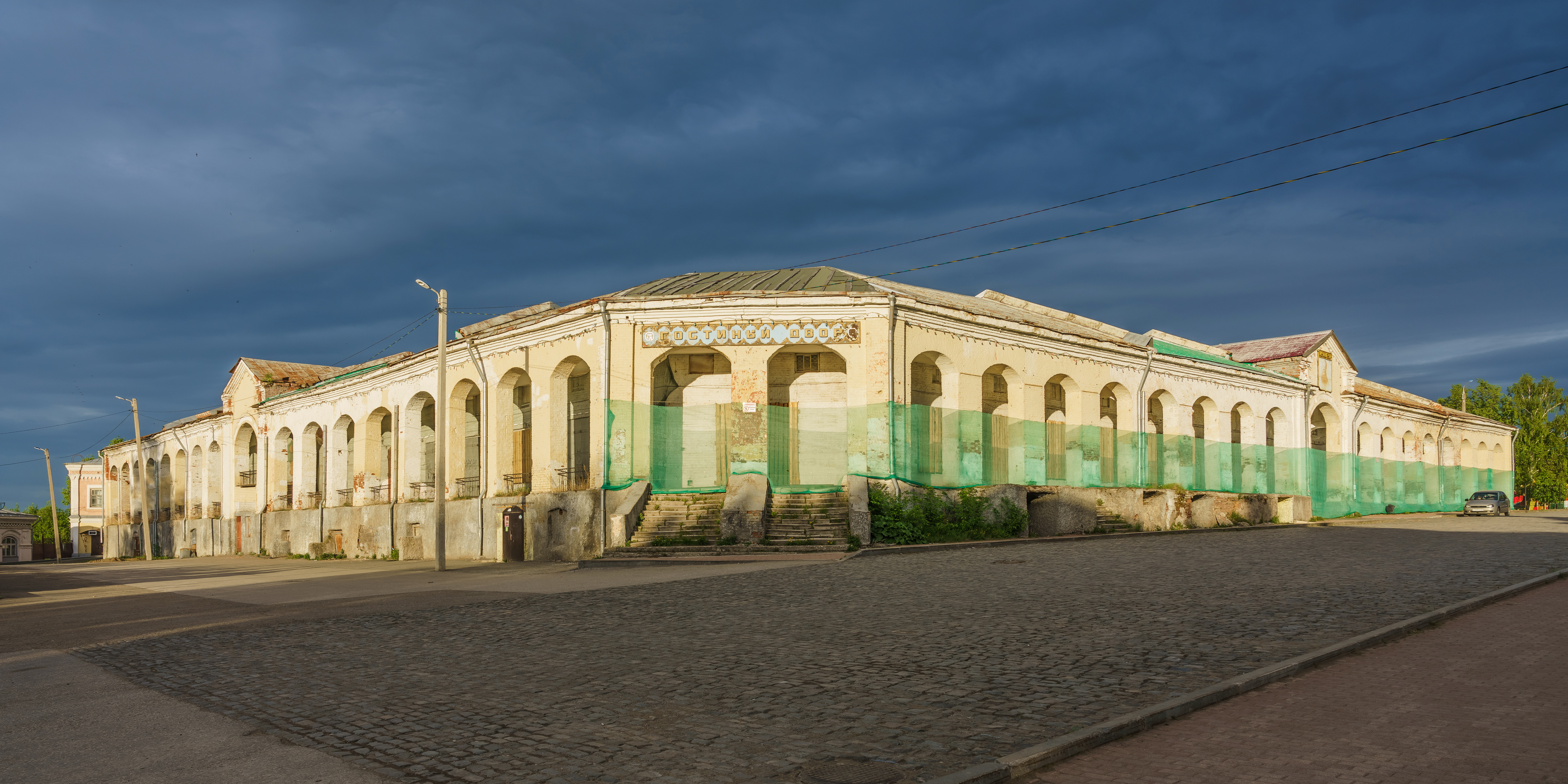
Gostiny dvor in Kungur (1865—1867)

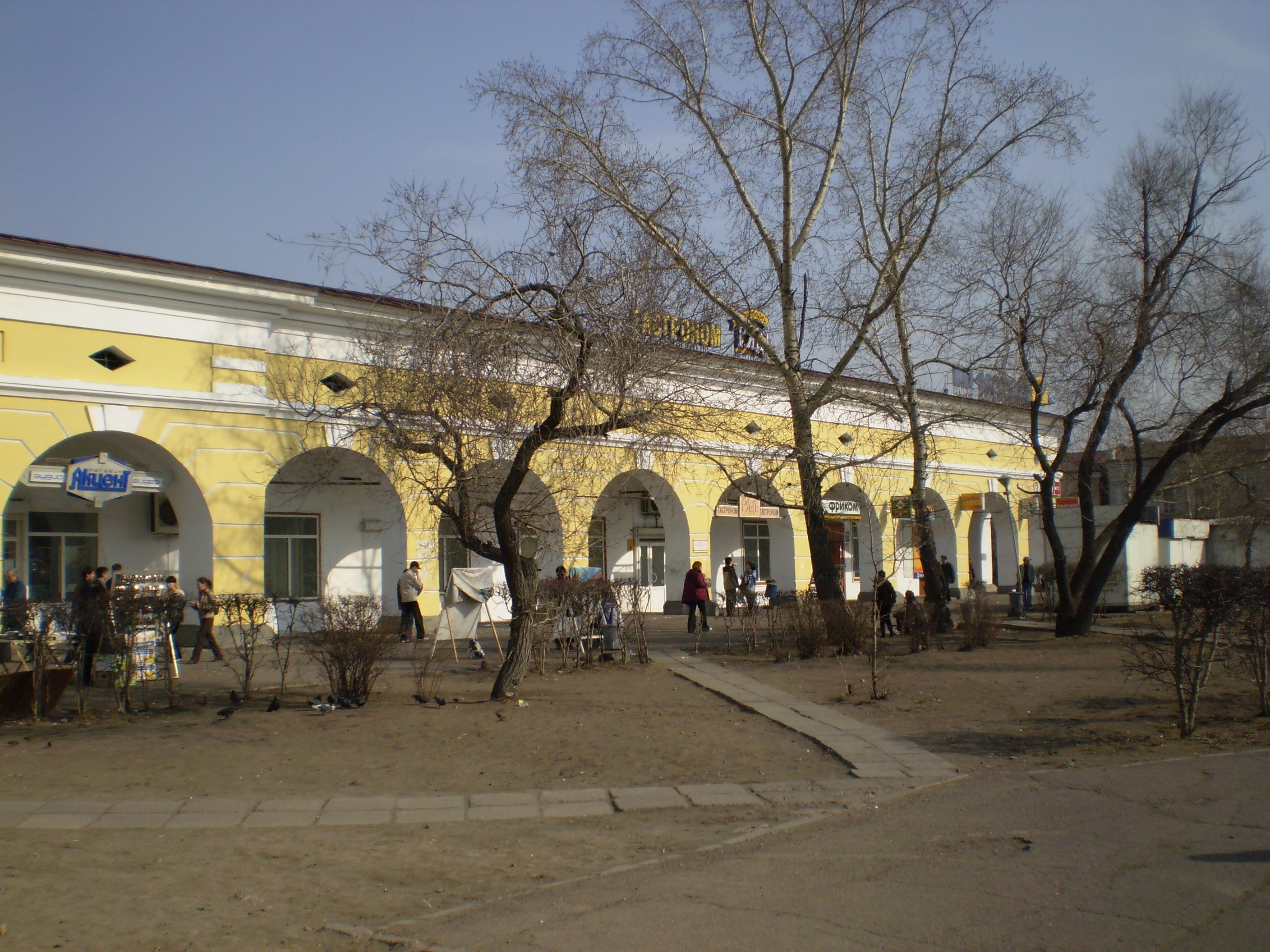
Gostiny dvor in Ulan-Ude

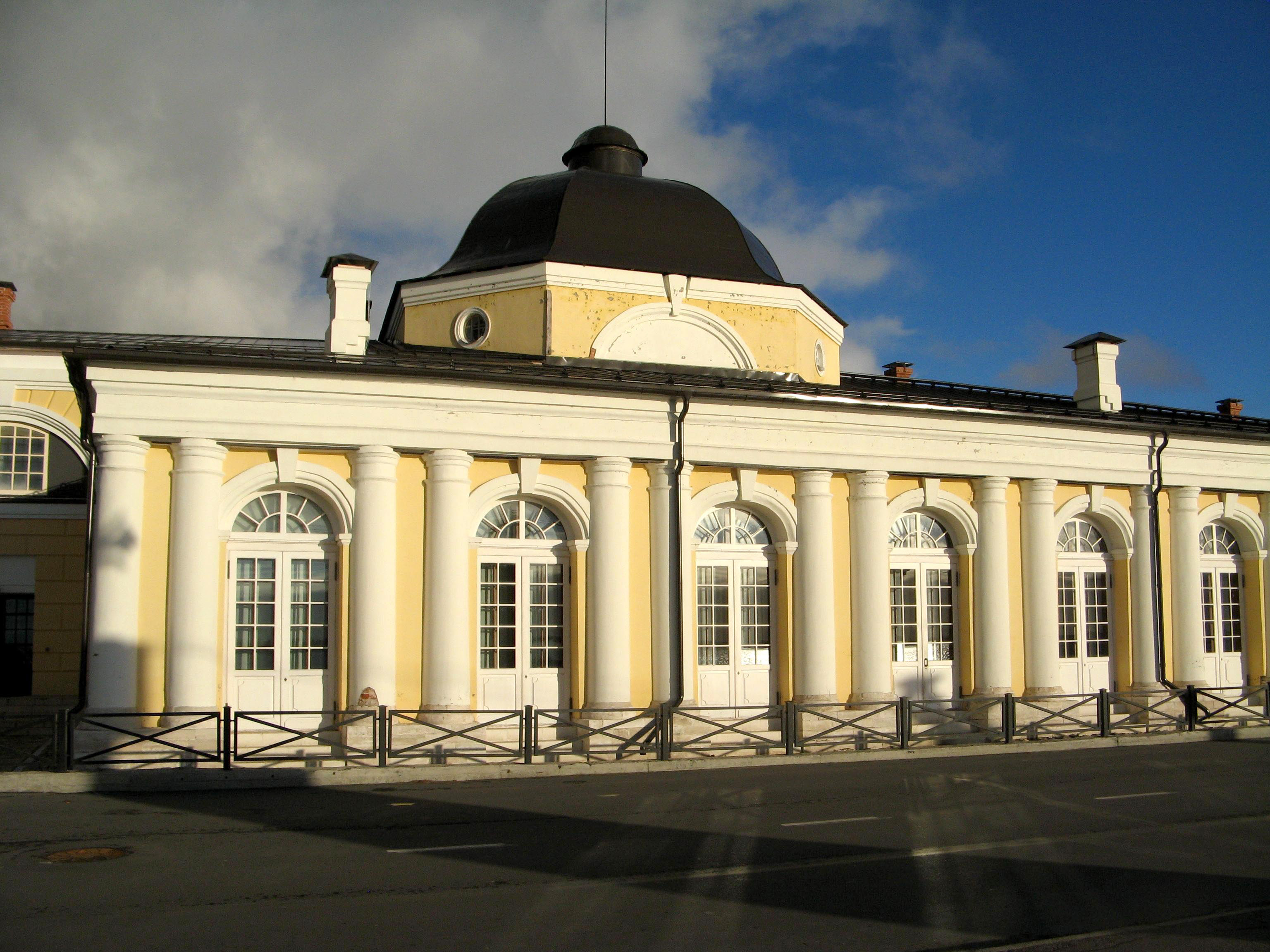
Exchange in Arkhangelsk Gostiny Dvor

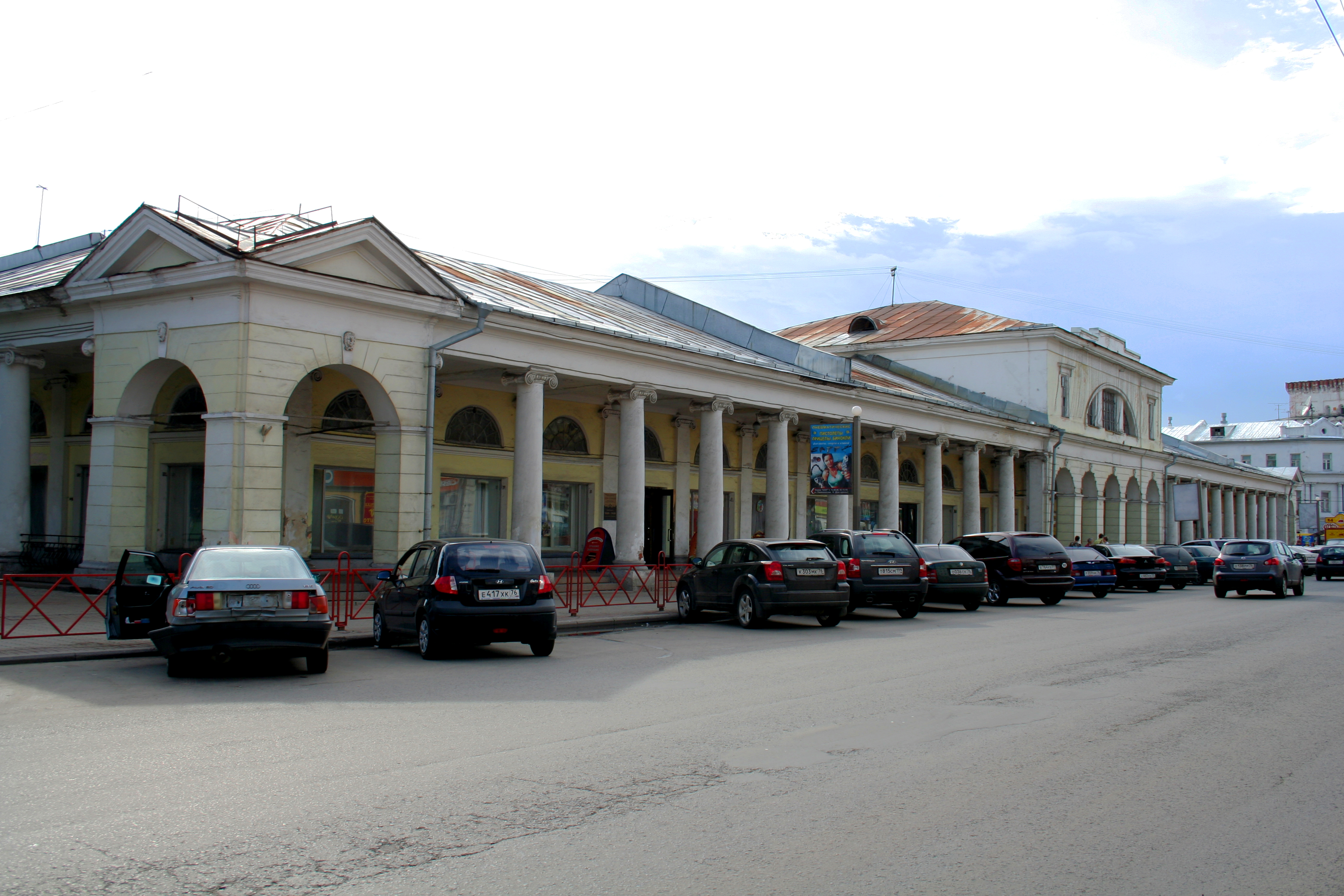
Gostiny dvor in Yaroslavl

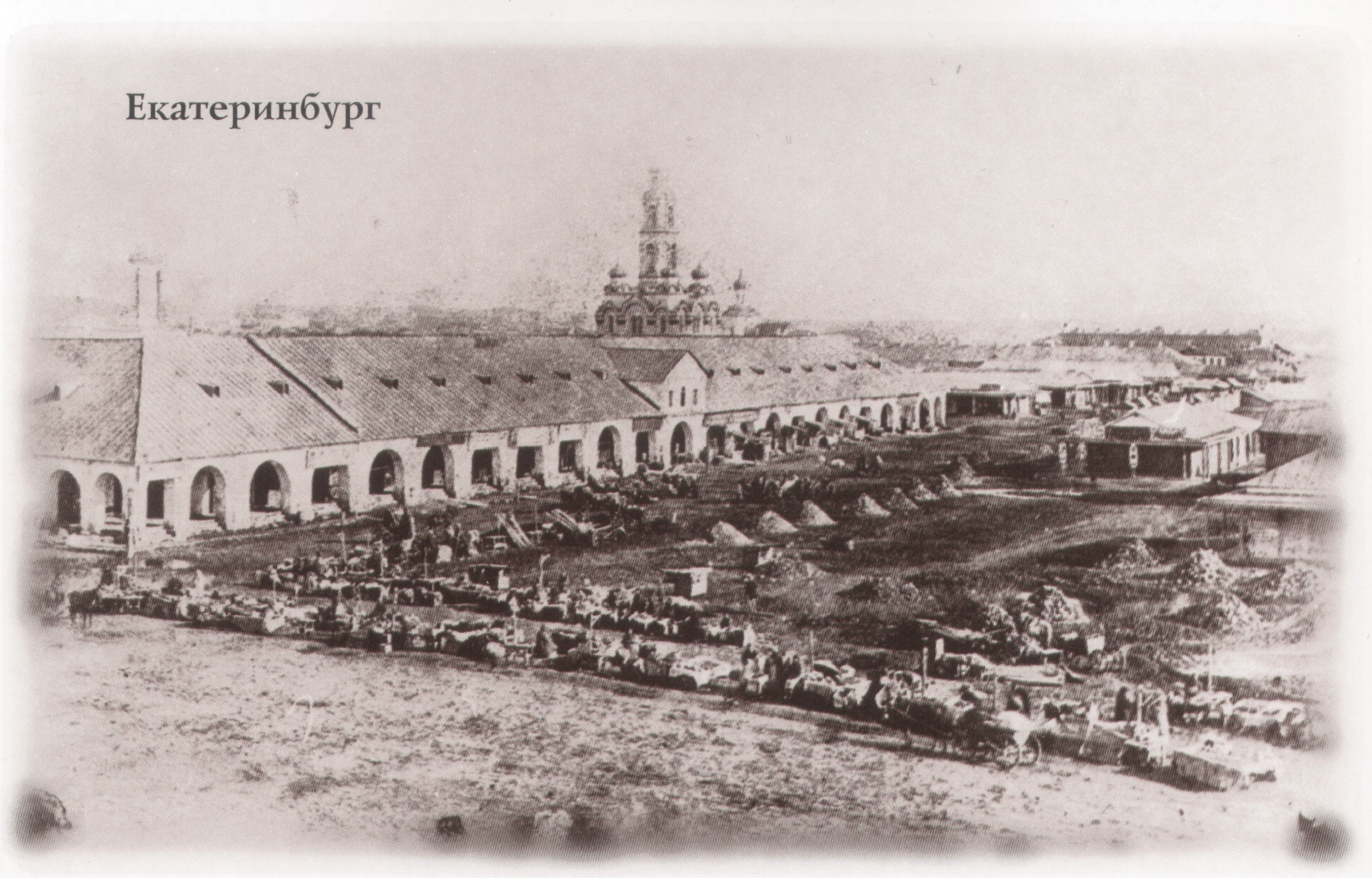
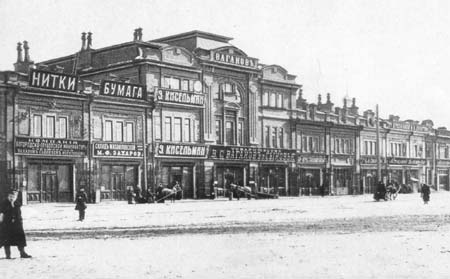
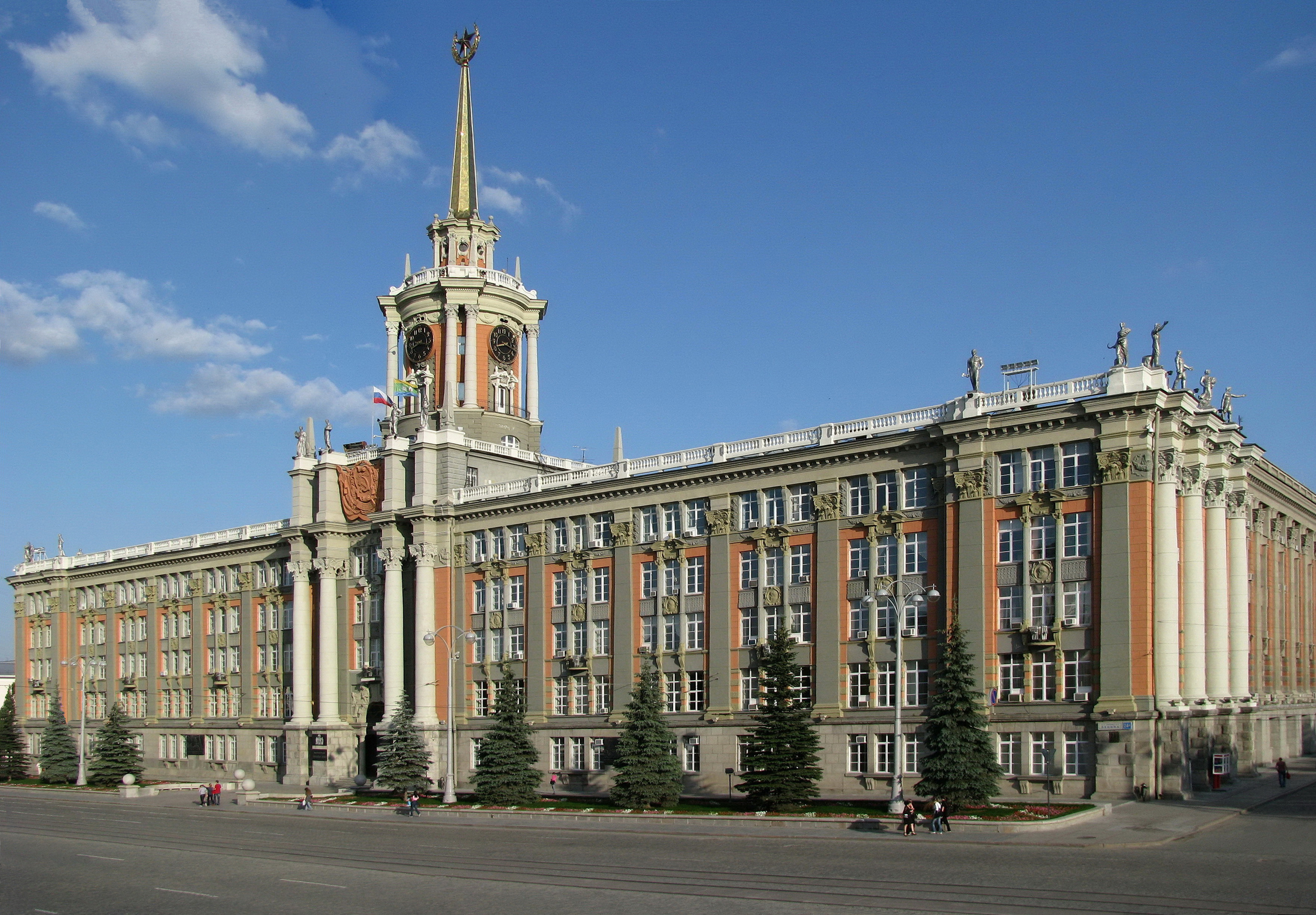
The Old Gostiny Dvor in Yekaterinburg (already the 4th reconstruction of the first 1720-es Gostiny Dvor) was later reconstructed into the New Gostiny Dvor, and eventually, into the City Administration building.

The name is commonly applied to the vast department store in St Petersburg. This Great Gostiny Dvor is not only the city's oldest and largest shopping centre, but also one of the first shopping arcades in the world. Sprawling at the intersection of Nevsky Prospekt and Sadovaya Street for over one kilometer and embracing the area of 53,000 m^{2} (570,000 sq ft), the indoor complex of more than 100 shops took 28 years to construct. Building works commenced in 1757 to an elaborate design by Bartolomeo Rastrelli, but that was subsequently discarded in favour of a less expensive and more functional Neoclassical design submitted by Jean-Baptiste Vallin de la Mothe (1729–1800).

Throughout the following century, Gostiny Dvor was continuously augmented, resulting in ten indoor streets and as many as 178 shops by the 20th century. By that time, the Gostiny Dvor had lost its popularity to the more fashionable Passage and New Passage, situated on the Nevsky Prospekt nearby. During the post-World War II reconstructions, its inner walls were demolished and a huge shopping mall came into being. This massive 18th-century structure got a face-lift recently and entered the 21st century as one of the most fashionable shopping centres in Eastern Europe. A nearby station of Saint Petersburg Metro takes its name from Gostiny Dvor.

Also on Sadovaya Street are the 18th-century Apraksin Dvor and Nikolsky Market.

=== Moscow ===
The Moscow Gostiny Dvor (Russian: Старый гостиный двор) or Old Merchant Court in Moscow occupies a substantial portion of Kitai-gorod, as the old merchant district is known. Formerly accommodating both shops and warehouses, it was constructed of brick in the 1590s and underwent significant modifications from 1638 to 41. As the Russian capital expanded and the old structure became overcrowded, a new indoor market was completed nearby in 1665.

Giacomo Quarenghi, the favored architect of Catherine the Great, in 1789 replaced those medieval buildings with a new shopping mall designed in a sober Neoclassical style with innumerable Corinthian columns and arcades. Several local Moscow architects including S. Karin, I. Egotov and P. Selihov supervised the actual construction. The first phase was delayed because of the death of Catherine the Great and it was not completed until 1805. Osip Bove made some modifications to adapt to the slope in the area and to finish following Quarenghi's original plans in 1830.

Subsequently, Quarenghi's structure went through many reconstructions. After the Revolution in 1923, the space was subdivided into offices altering the original design significantly. Recently a modern glass roof in 1995 was installed, when Gostiny Dvor was being converted into a fashionable exhibition ground. Nowadays, the edifice is used as the setting for fashion shows, business parties, and even Viennese balls. Montserrat Caballé and José Carreras were among those who performed at the New Year parties in Gostiny Dvor.

During the 1995 renovations, much archeological work was done on the site. A small museum was established to exhibit some of the numerous finds which include the contents of a pantry from a 17th-century merchant home that had been destroyed by fire. The exhibit hall is open daily, Monday through Saturday from 11 a.m. until 5 p.m.

=== Arkhangelsk ===
The Merchant Court (Гостиный двор) is a network of fortified depots built on the Pur-Navolok promontory in Arkhangelsk by a team of German and Dutch masons between 1668 and 1684. Only the northern tower of the original structure and parts of the western wall facing the Northern Dvina still stand.

In the 17th century, Arkhangelsk handled more than half of the country's exports. The local merchant court was rebuilt in stone after the fire in May 1667. The complex consisted of the Russian and German courts (for native and foreign merchants, respectively) and the so-called Stone Town (Каменный город) wedged in between.

After Peter the Great conquered the Baltic coastline and moved the capital to St. Petersburg, most foreign trade was rerouted and the Arkhangelsk trade center was abandoned. In the 19th century, the remaining buildings were used as a customs house. The Neoclassical bourse with a squat tower was added to the complex in 1788.

By the mid-20th century, many buildings had fallen into irreparable decay and were demolished. In 1981, the crumbling structure was adapted to house a local-history museum. Restoration has been underway since 1992. It is still delayed by lack of funds.

=== Kostroma ===
The Gostiny Dvor in Kostroma is the best-preserved complex of provincial Neoclassical trading arcades in Russia. It was built on the site of the ancient Kostroma kremlin after the great fire of 1773. The complex comprises more than ten buildings constructed over a period of almost five decades.

The merchant court was designed by Charles Claire, although many other architects (including Vasily Stasov) modified the original design. The construction was supervised by the local Vorotilov family. Each arch was occupied by a separate shop or tavern. The ground floor was for trade, whereas the second and third floors were for storage and general warehousing.

The centerpiece of the inner trade square is the five-domed Saviour Church (1766) with a distinctive tall belltower. The white obelisks flanking the main entrance were erected to commemorate a royal visit to the city in 1823.
