= Sadovaya Street =

Thoroughfare in Saint Petersburg, Russia

Coordinates: 59.9321°N 30.3302°E

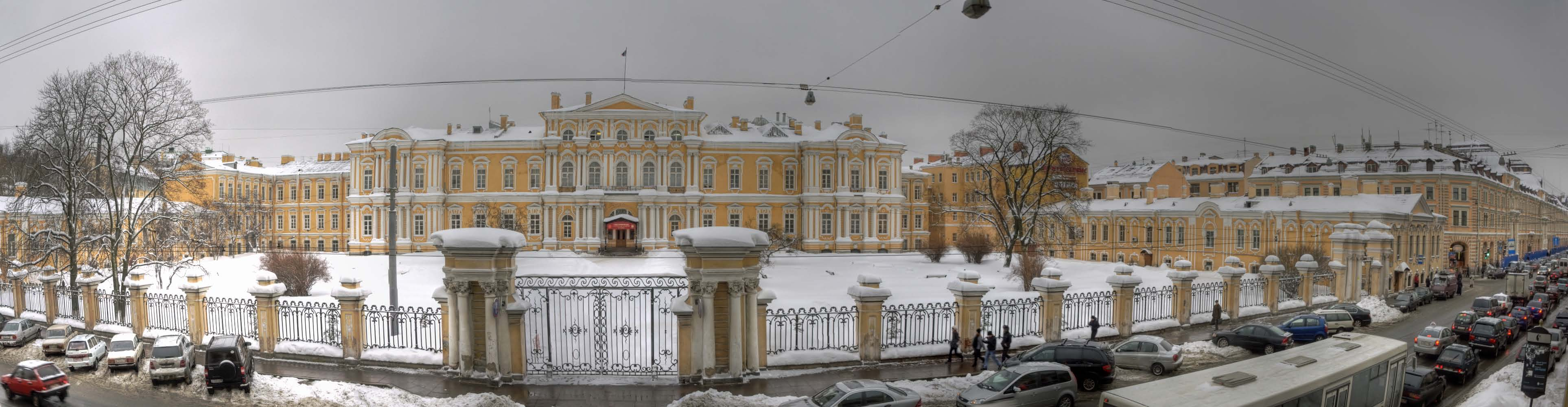
The Vorontsov Palace on Sadovaya Street

Sadovaya Street or Garden Street is a major thoroughfare in Saint Petersburg, Russia, passing through the historic city center.

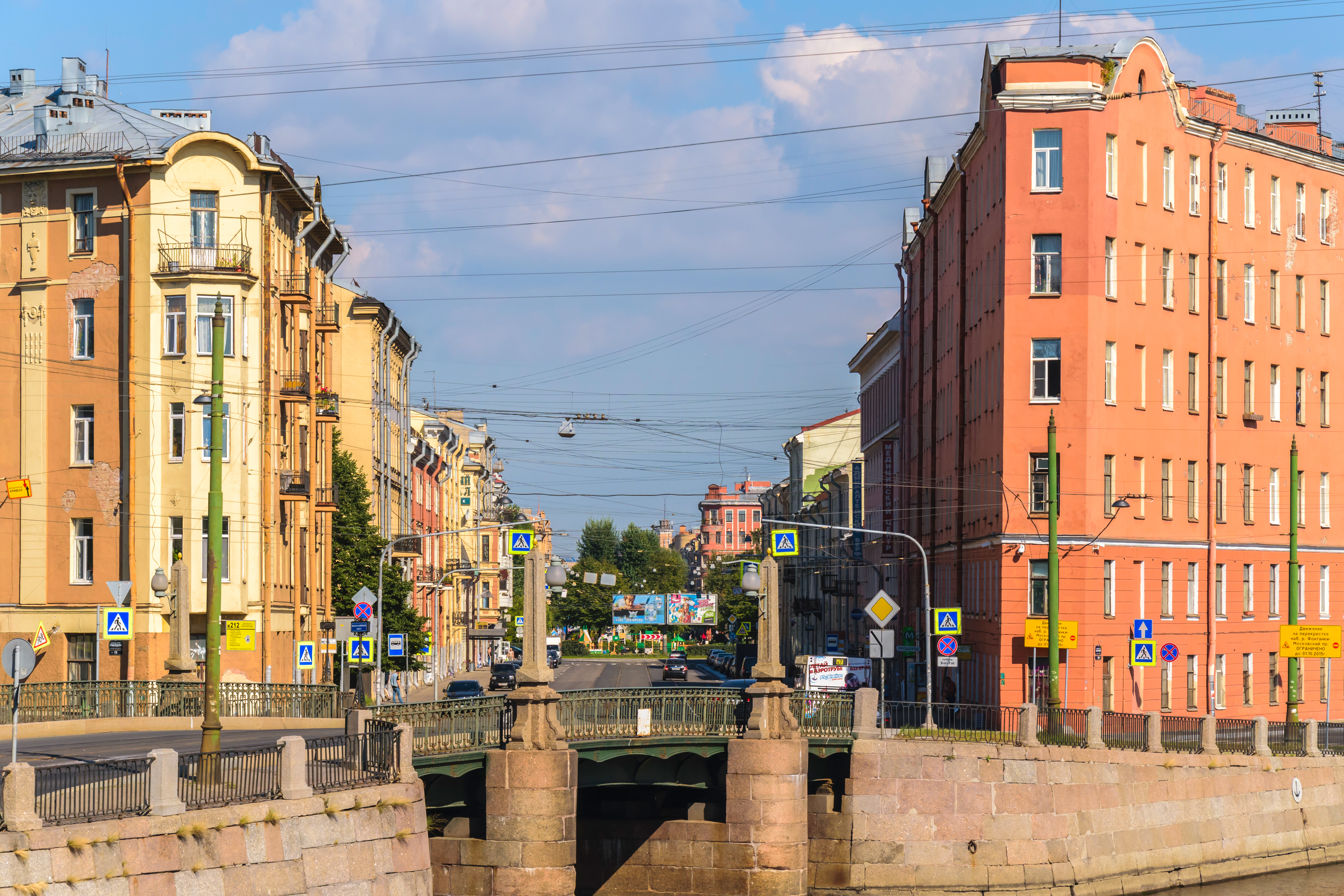
Sadovaya Street Perspective from Fontanka River near Malo-Kalinkin Bridge in Saint Petersburg, Russia.

The street has great cultural and historical significance, passing by many historical and architectural monuments from the 18th, 19th, and 20th centuries, including the Mikhailovsky, Vorontsov, and Moika (Yusupov) palaces. The street serves many important transportation functions, linking the central areas of the city, and is home to many markets, including Gostiny Dvor, Apraksin Dvor, and the Hay Market. Among the figures in Russian history who lived on Sadovaya are Dmitry Milyutin, Aleksey Kuropatkin, Mikhail Lermontov, Demyan Bedny, Ivan Krylov, Mikhail Petrashevsky, Yuri Lisyansky, Apollon Maykov, Yevgeny Tarle, and Sergei Prokofiev.

== History ==
The street was laid out ca. 1710. It runs from Nevsky Prospekt to the Gorokhovaya Street. The street was filled with wealthy estates, with large gardens, from where the street got its name. Later on, ca. 1730, the street was being built on to the southwestern direction, and two squares were built; Sennaya Square and Turgenev Square.

Later on, ca. 1820, the street was being built northwards on to the Field of Mars. Garden Street was the trading center of Saint Petersburg in the 18th to the 19th century.

During the Russian Civil War, the street was the site of several demonstrations and counter-demonstrations.

== Geography ==
From east to west, it begins near the Field of Mars, crosses the Moika River at the First Sadovy Bridge, then passes over Spassky Island, the Kryukov Canal (at the Staro-Nikolsky Bridge), and Pokrovsky Island, before finally ending at the junction of the Griboyedov Canal and the Fontanka River. The section from the Moika to Gorokhovaya Street belongs to the Central District of the city, and the rest, to the Admiralteysky District. The street is 4376 m in length and about 8 m in width, and the distance between the buildings can be up to 18 m.

== Transport ==
The Garden Street is a major transport hub. There's trolleys, tramways, buses and marshrutkas. The street is served by three stations of the Saint Petersburg Metro: Sennaya Ploshchad, Sadovaya, and Gostiny Dvor.

== Notable places ==
- Apraksin Yard
- Field of Mars
- Merchant Yard
- Mikhailovsky Garden
- Vorontsov Palace
- Yusupov Palace
- Nikolskie ryady market
- State Assignation Bank built between 1783 and 1790 by Italian architect Giacomo Quarengi.
