= Nikolsky Market =

Coordinates: 59°55′15″N 30°18′06″E

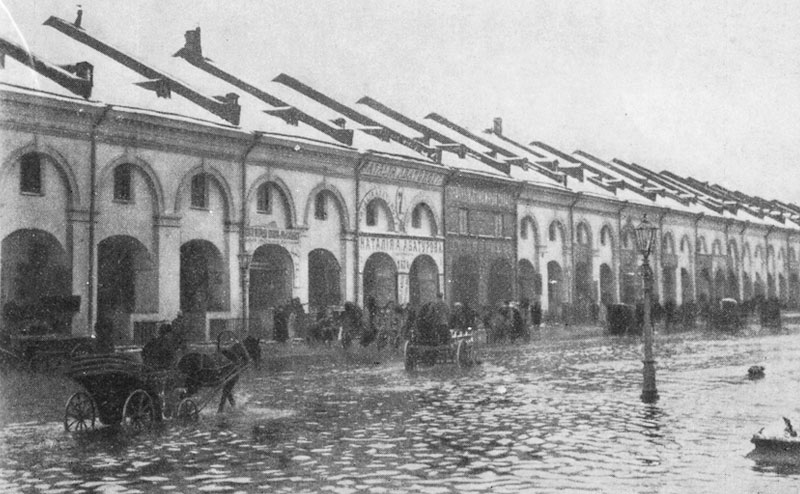
Nikolskie Ryady in 1903 during floods

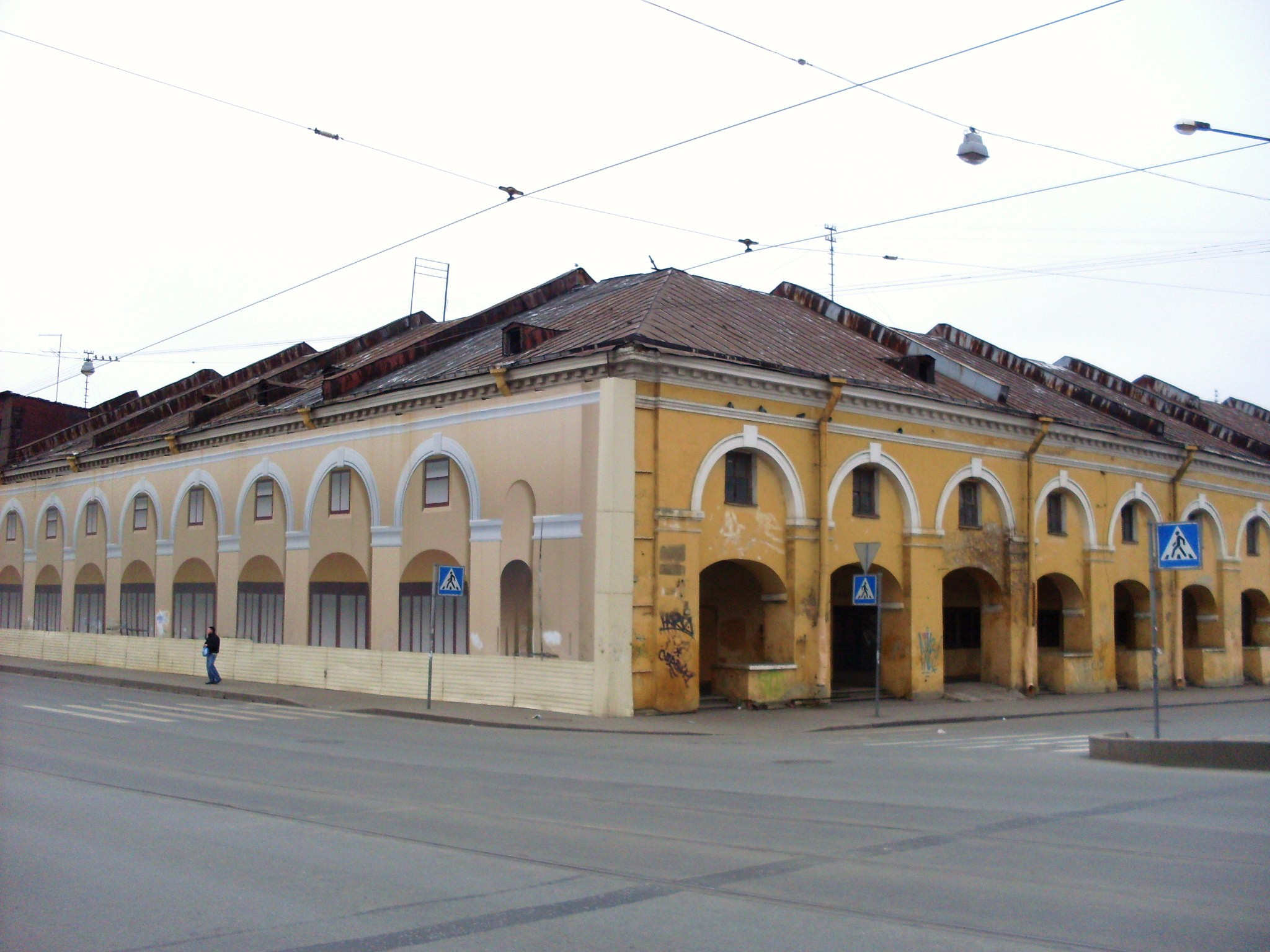
Nikolskie Ryady in 2009

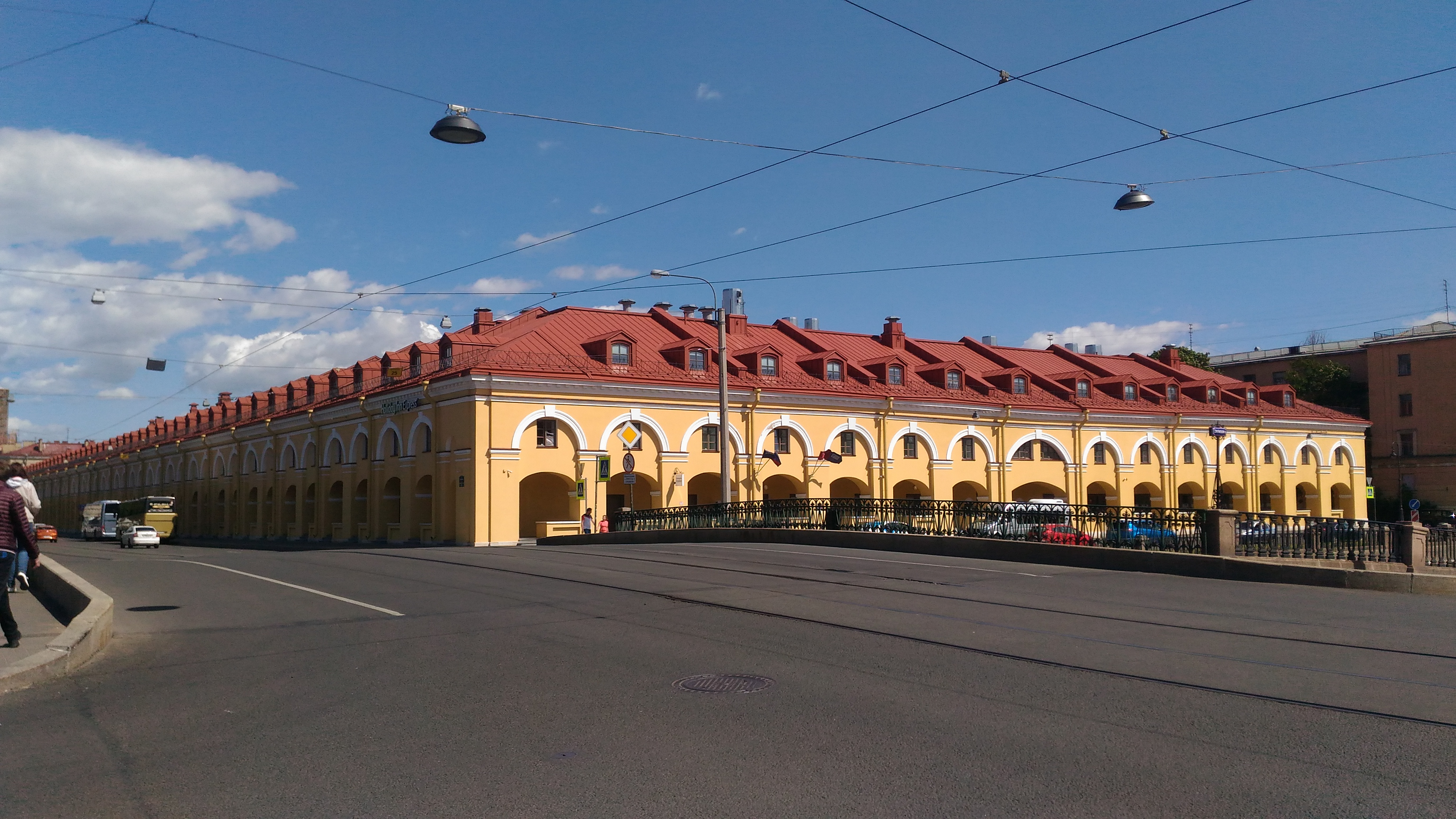
Nikolskie Ryady in 2019 after renovation

Nikolsky Market or Nikolskie ryady (Russian: Никольские ряды , rows of Nicholas) is a commercial building at 62 Sadovaya Street in Saint Petersburg, built in 1789. The redevelopment of this building has caused some controversy among local residents and preservationists.

== History ==
The Nikolskie Rady indoor market was built in 1789, around the same time as the Izmailovsky Gostiny Dvor.

== Present ==
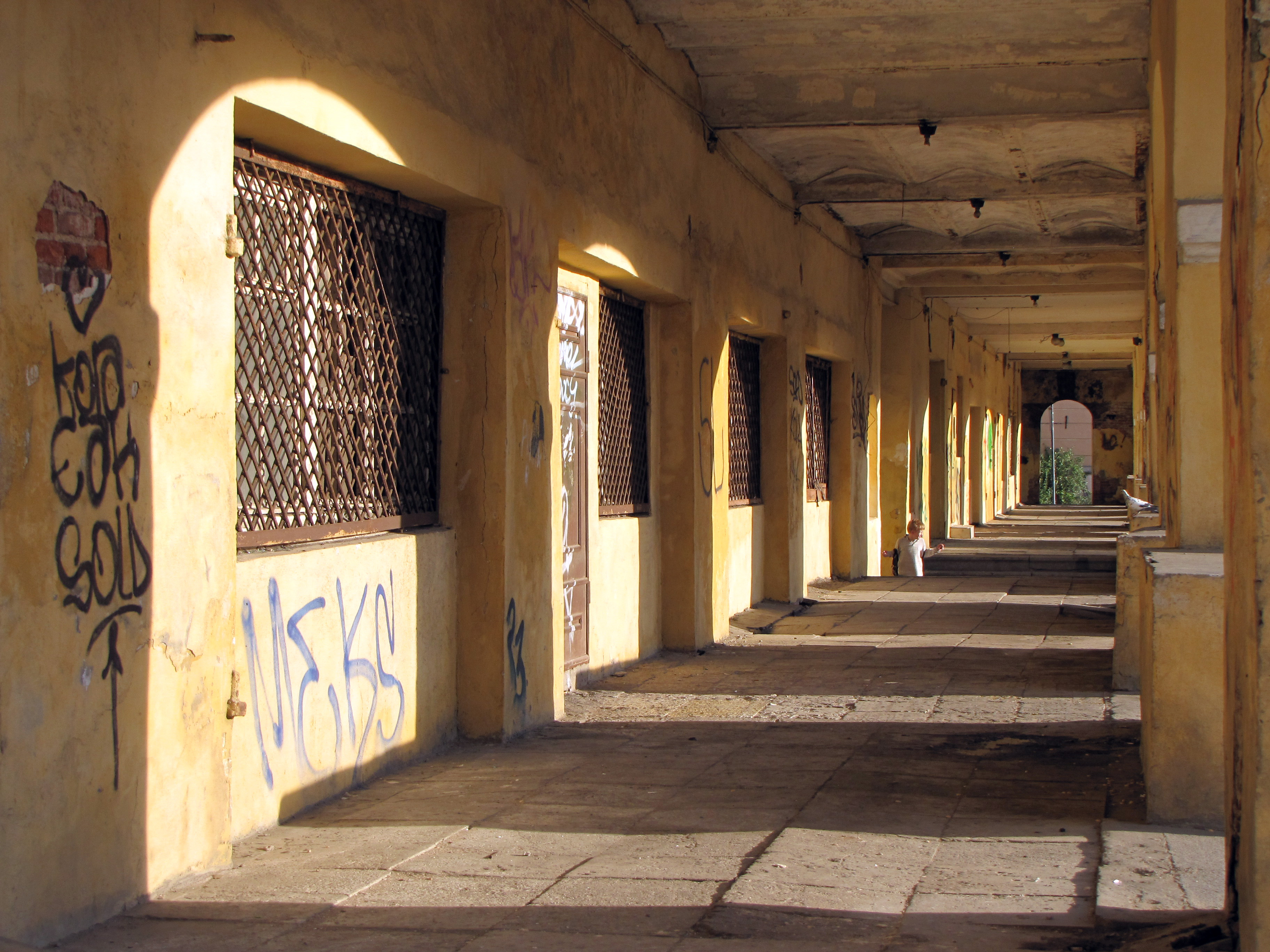
Nikolskie Ryady in 2011

In September 2006, a construction company said that "Nikolskie Ryady" required complete reconstruction which would take between 30 and 36 months. This is because the building required the complete replacement of its systems for utilities like electricity, heating and water. The proposed work involved keeping the historic facade and dimensions.:

Two years later, however, the building's tenants noted that 70% of the structure could be classified as being in an emergency condition. A project was proposed that actually involved demolishing about 50% of the building although it would still retain the building's facade and the gallery (illustrated). This would regain that part of the building that was currently unoccupied and create a hotel complex, a market and two-storey underground parking. In May, 2008 the Committee on State Control, Use and Protection of Monuments of History and Culture disagreed with the assessment of the status of the building. However the dates of reconstruction (2010), and the cost of renovation ($200 million) were announced.

The committee, represented by its director, Vera Dementieva, proposed financial assistance to investors, controlled by Andrei Yakunin (son of the head of JSC "RZD" Vladimir Yakunin), which they said was necessary for the complete restoration of the building.

On November 19, 2010, Nikolskie Ryady market was sold at auction to the organization, which conducts the restoration work. On November 30, the building was included in the federal list of protected sites. Despite this, the current project includes renovation of building underground parking, a glass dome over the object and building inland. Experts doubt that such a project is compatible with the preservation of the monument.
