= Benjamin Patersen =

Russian painter

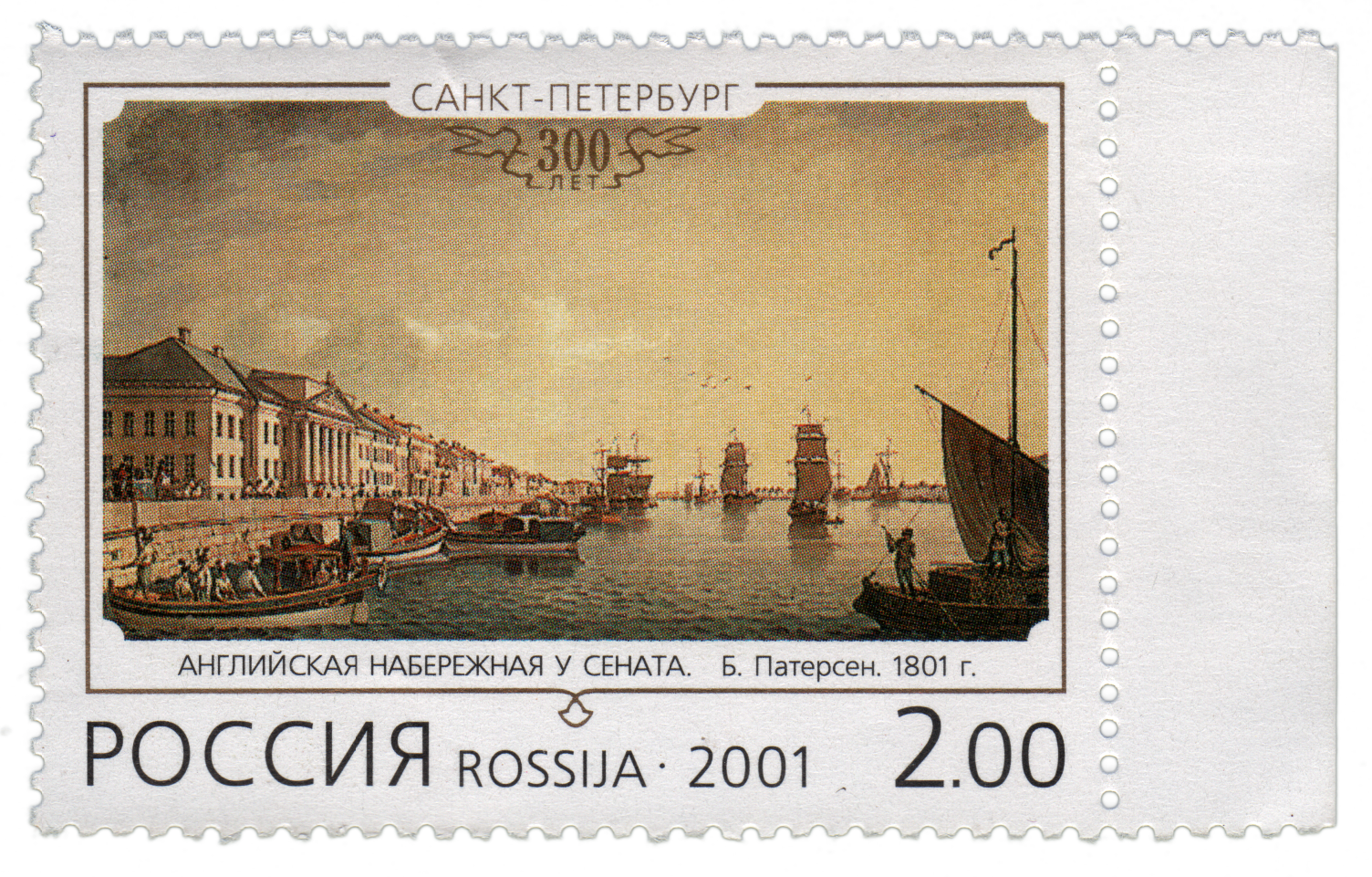
Russian postage stamp with Patersen's view of the English Embankment.

Benjamin Patersen, or Patersson (Russian: Бенжамен Патерсен; 2 September 1748/50, in Varberg 1815, in Saint Petersburg), was a Swedish-born Russian painter and engraver known primarily for his cityscapes.

== Biography ==
Benjamin Patersen was born in Varberg to a family of customs clerks. Little is known of his early years and childhood. He studied art in Gothenburg from Simon Fick and soon became a member of the Local Art Society. In the late 1770s he travelled to Poland, Latvia and Lithuania. From 1774 to 1786, he resided and worked in Riga.

In 1787, Patersen came to St Petersburg. According to his advertisement, given in the ‘Sankt-Peterburgskie Vedomosti’ newspaper on the 22 of January, 1787, he stayed in house No. 154 near the Blue Bridge. Patersen got married in 1791 and baptized his daughter in 1795 in the Church of Saint Catherine.

He never lost touch with Sweden. It is known that he visited the country in 1806. Since 1790, he sent his works to the annual exhibitions at the Royal Swedish Academy of Arts, in 1798, he was named its member.

In the mid-1790s, Patersen was given the first contract by the Royal Court. Soon, he was appointed to a court painter position.

== Art and legacy ==
Though he began as a portraitist, at the age of 38 Patersen concentrated on cityscapes and, after moving to St Petersburg, devoted his art to that city. Around 1800, on a commission by Tsar Paul I, Patersen created a series of works depicting the banks of the Neva, which earned him an appointment as court painter.

Most of his cityscapes feature the defined horizon line. The sky and waters of the Neva often play significant roles in the composition. Patersen drew most of the prominent buildings of the late XVIII century Petersburg, including the St. Michael's Castle, the Imperial Academy of Arts, the Tauride Palace, etc.

Patersen created over 100 of Petersburg's cityscapes; 33 in oil, the rest watercolours or tinted engravings. Collectively, they represent an irreplaceable historical record of the city as it was at that time. Most of his works are currently held by the Hermitage.

== Selected works ==
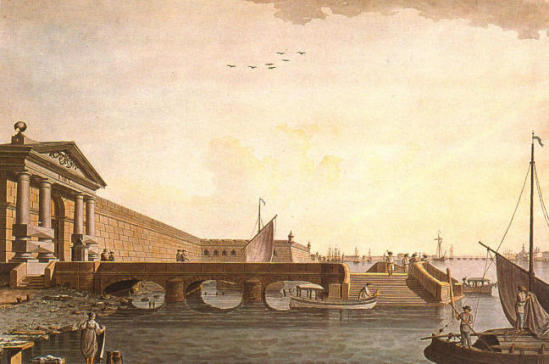
Neva Gate,
Peter and Paul Fortress

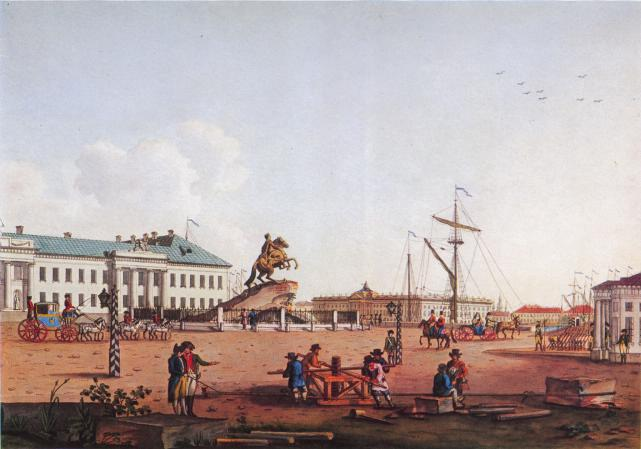
Senate Square

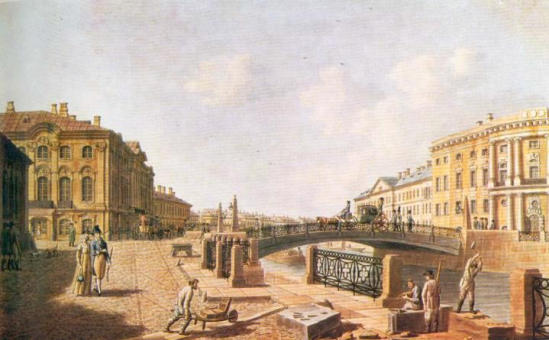
Green Bridge

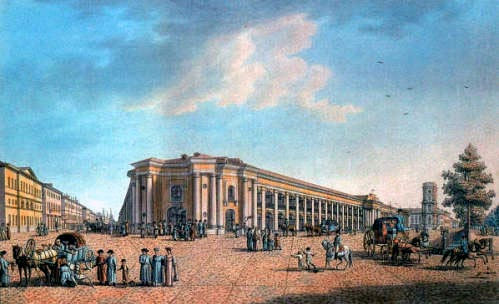
Great Gostiny Dvor

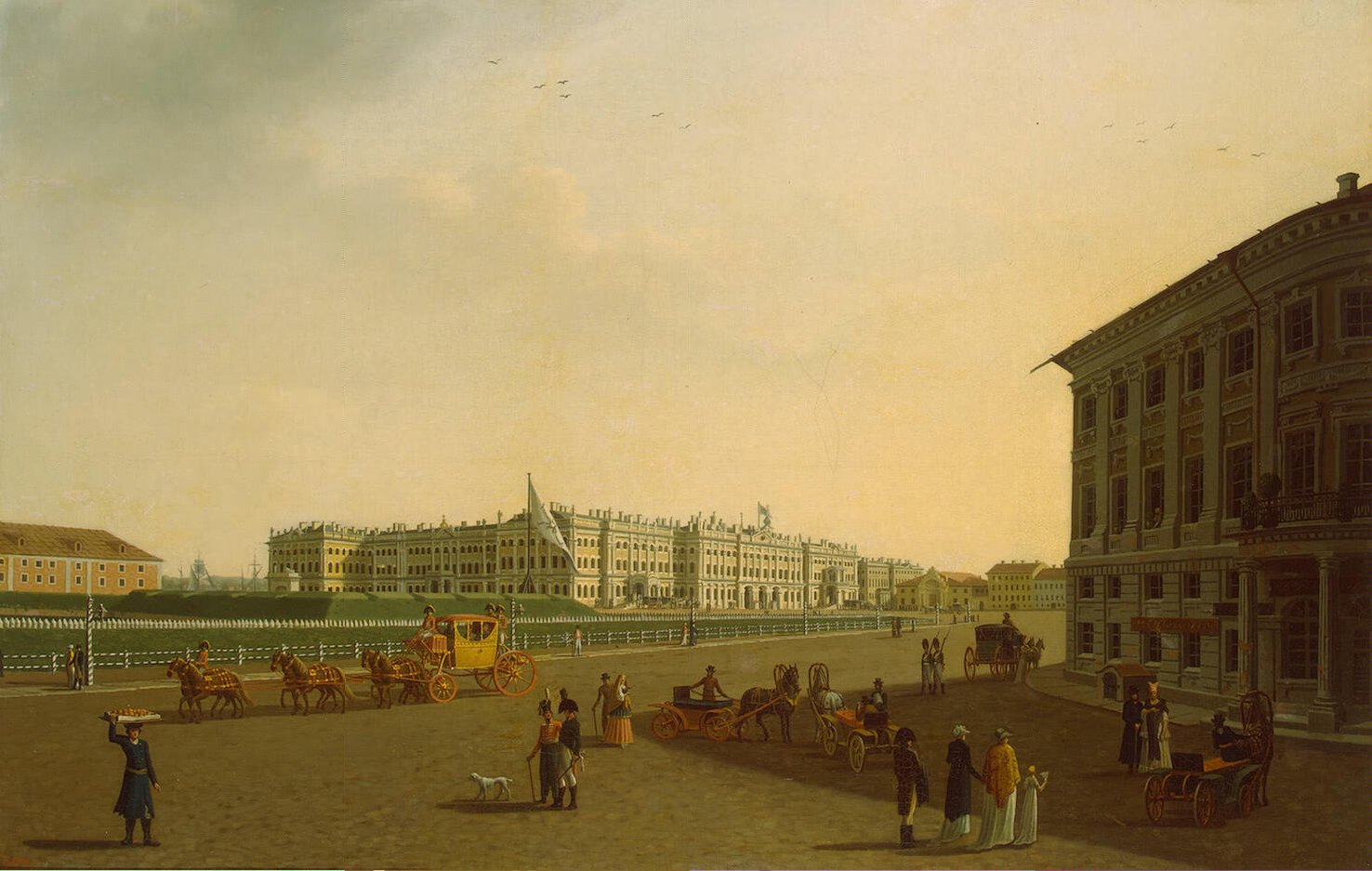
View of Palace Square and Winter Palace from the beginning of Nevsky Prospect

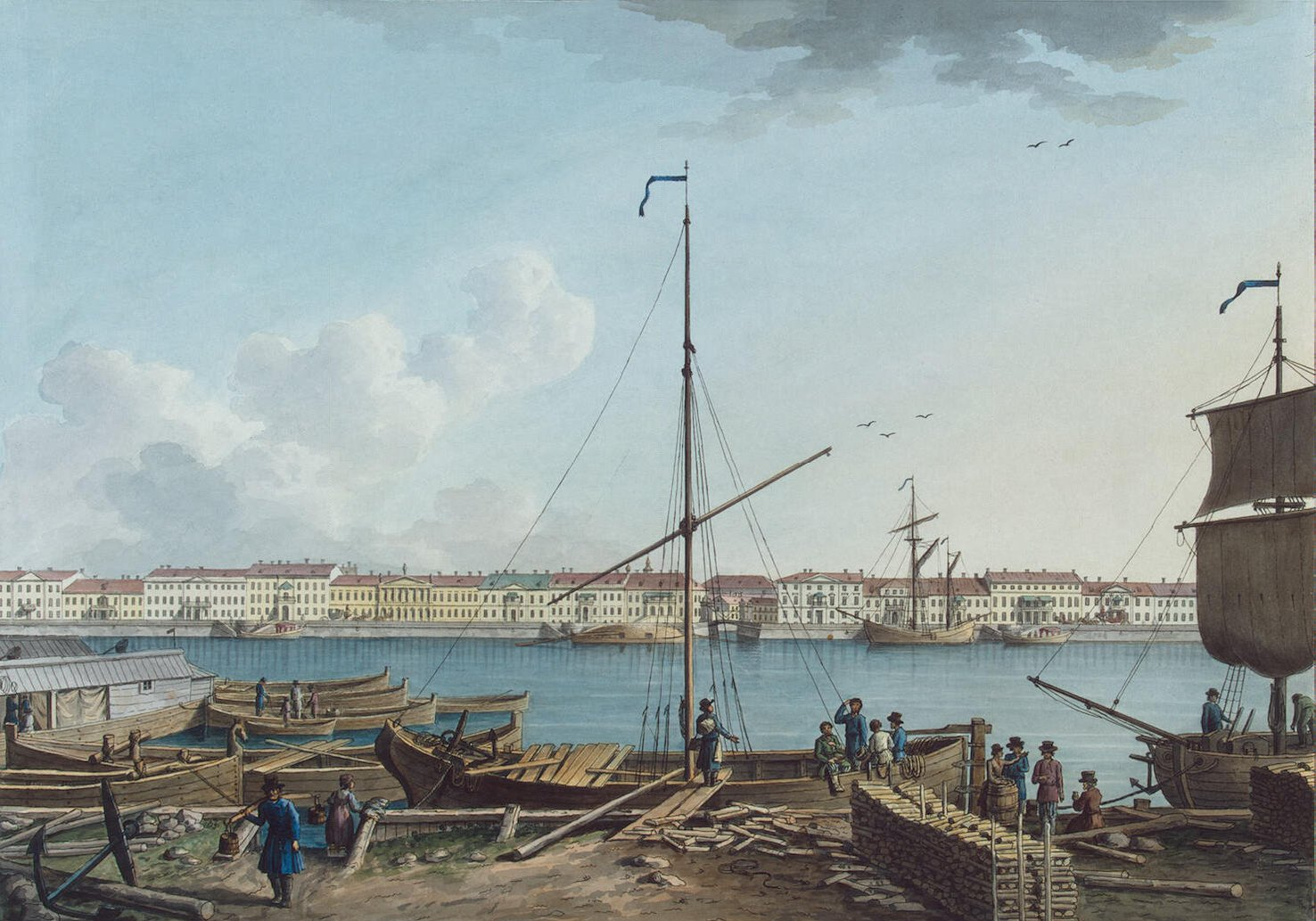
The English Embankment from Vasilyevsky Island

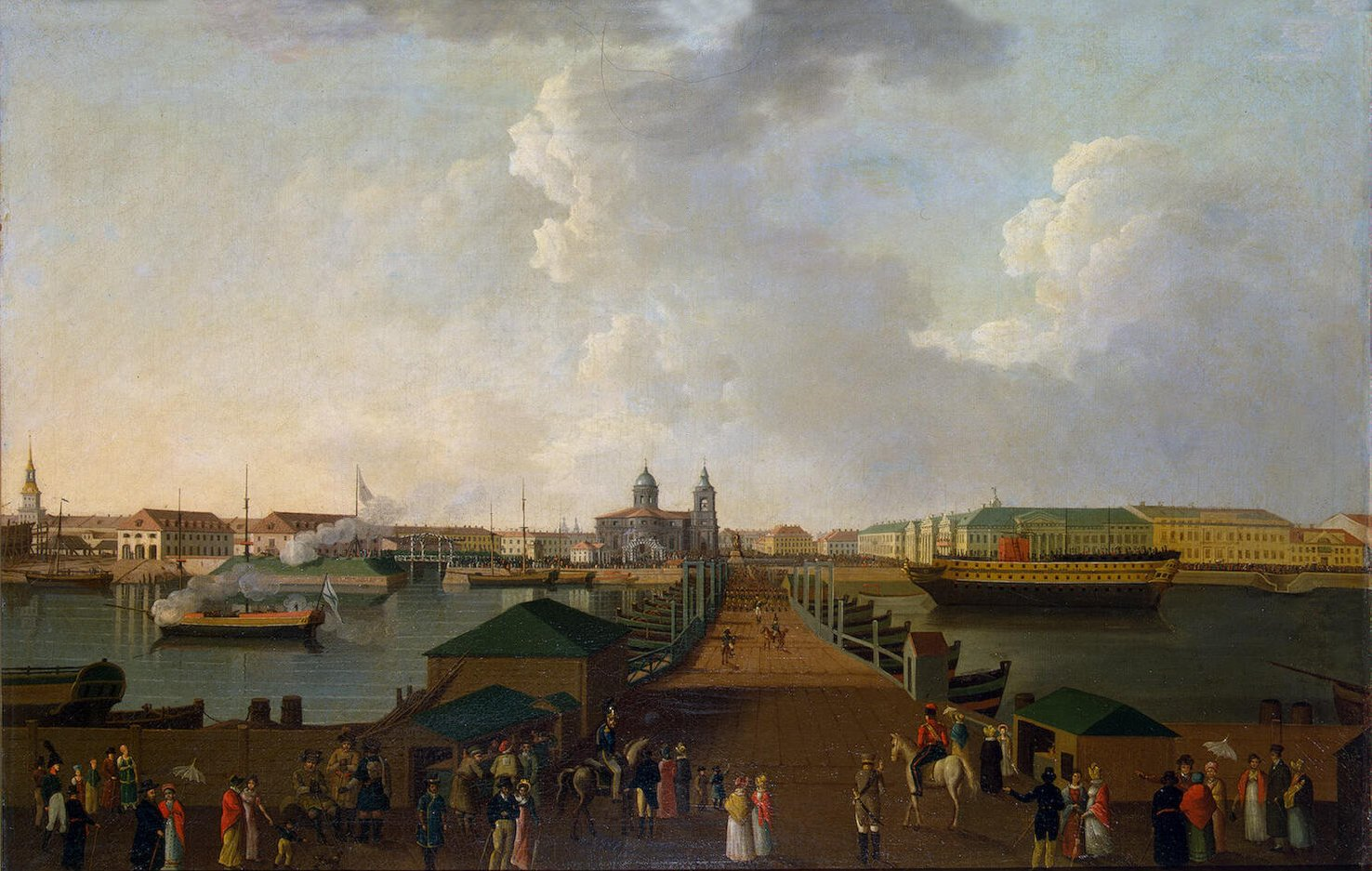
View of Saint Petersburg in the centenary celebration's day

== Sources ==
- Komelova, G. N. (1984). Петербург конца XVIII – начала XIX века в акварелях и гравюрах Бенжамена Патерсена [Petersburg of the XVIII – XIX Centuries in Watercolours and Engravings by Benjamin Patersen] (in Russian). Moscow: ‘Izobrazitelynoe Iskusstvo’ Publishing House.
- Bengt, Jangfeldt (2010). От варягов до Нобеля. Шведы на берегах Невы [Since the Varangians to Nobel: the Swedes on the Banks of Neva] (in Russian). Moscow: Lomonosov Publishing House. p. 392. ISBN 978-591678-041-3.
- Brook, J. V.; Iovleva, L. I. (1998). Государственная Третьяковская галерея: Живопись XVIII-XX веков [The State Tretyakov Gallery: Painting of the XVIII-XX Centuries] (in Russian). Moscow: Krasnaya Ploshad. ISBN 5-900743-40-3.
- Franklin, Simon; Bowers, Katherine (2017). Information and Empire: Mechanisms of Communication in Russia, 1600-1854. Cambridge, UK: OpenBook Publishers. ISBN 978-1-78374-376-6.
- Franklin, Simon (2019). The Russian Graphosphere, 1450-1850. Cambridge, UK: Cambridge University Press. p. 161. ISBN 978-1-108-49257-7.
- Konovalov, Eduard (2008). Новый полный биографический словарь русских художников [The New Complete Biographical Dictionary of Russian Artists]. Moscow: Eksmo Publishing house. p. 378. ISBN 978-5-699-20636-0.
