= Arkhangelsk Gostiny Dvor =

Network of fortified depots in Arkhangelsk

Coordinates: 64°32′21″N 40°30′40″E

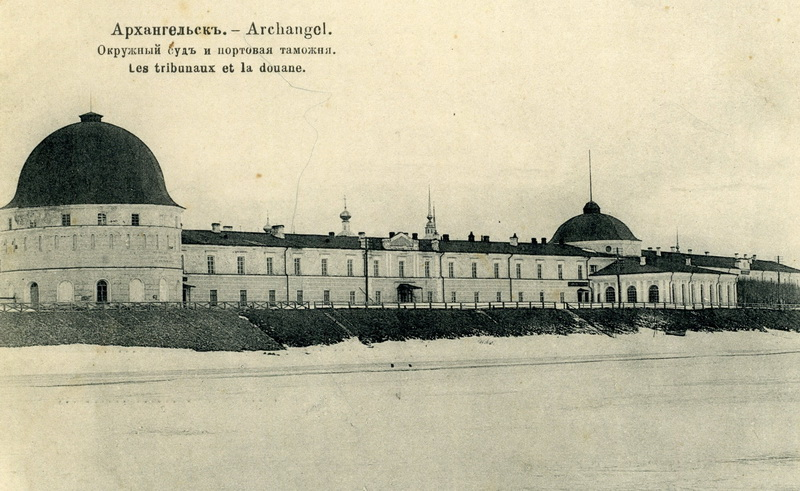
The Gostiny Dvor is the oldest surviving building in Arkhangelsk

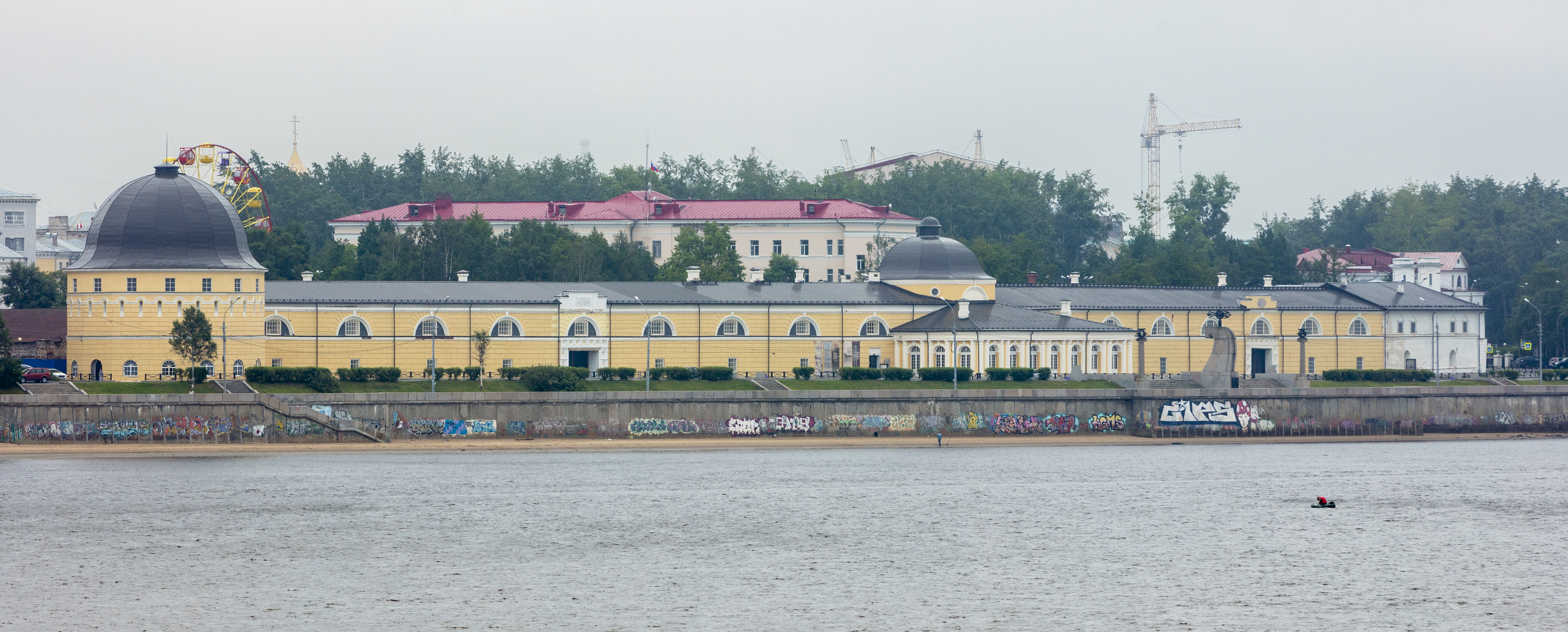
The Gostiny Dvor (in 2016)

The Merchant Court (Russian: Гостиный двор) is a network of fortified depots built on the Pur-Navolok promontory in Arkhangelsk by a team of German and Dutch masons between 1668 and 1684. Only the northern tower of the original structure and parts of the western wall facing the Northern Dvina still stand.

In the 17th century Arkhangelsk handled more than half of the country's exports. The local merchant court was rebuilt in stone after the fire in May 1667. The complex consisted of the Russian and German courts (for native and foreign merchants, respectively) and the so-called Stone Town (Каменный город) wedged in between.

After Peter the Great conquered the Baltic coastline and moved the capital to St. Petersburg, most foreign trade was rerouted and the Arkhangelsk trade center was abandoned. In the 19th century the remaining buildings were used as a customs house. The Neoclassical bourse with a squat tower was added to the complex in 1788.

By the mid-20th century many buildings had fallen into irreparable decay and were demolished. In 1981 the crumbling structure was adapted to house a local-history museum. Restoration has been underway since 1992. It is still delayed by lack of funds.
