= Jean-Baptiste Vallin de la Mothe =

French architect (1729–1800)

Jean-Baptiste Michel Vallin de la Mothe
- Born: 1729; Angoulême, France
- Died: 7 May 1800; Angoulême, France
- Occupation: Architect
- Buildings: New Holland Island, Imperial Academy of Arts, Great Gostiny Dvor

Jean-Baptiste Michel Vallin de la Mothe (1729 – 7 May 1800) was a French architect whose major career was spent in St. Petersburg, where he became court architect to Catherine II. His students were Ivan Starov and Vasily Bazhenov.

== Biography ==
=== Early years and education ===
He was born in Angoulême. Vallin de la Mothe graduated in 1750 in Paris, soon with the help of his cousin Jacques-François Blondel he entered the French Academy in Rome. According to his letters of that period, Vallin de la Mothe had a great interest to Andrea Palladio and Vincenzo Scamozzi. Beginning in 1750, Vallin de la Mothe spent two years studying at the French Academy in Rome, though not as an official pensionnaire. He graduated with distinction and was elected as a member of Academies of Arts in Florence and Bologna.

On his return to Paris he was one of the architects who presented projects for Place Lous XV.

=== Work in Russia ===
In 1759, Vallin de la Mothe accepted an offer extended through the Russian ambassador Aleksei Petrovich Bestuzhev-Ryumin, prompted by Blondel, to create Imperial Academy of Arts in St. Petersburg and teach architecture there. De la Mothe's high reputation in professional circles is supported with the fact, that he was also recommended by Jacques-Germain Soufflot.

In St. Petersburg, Vallin de la Mothe adjusted Blondel's designs for a pet project of Shuvalov, the Imperial Academy of Arts (1765–72), in the form of a large open square with a circular central court. As a professor at the Academy, Vallin de la Mothe taught many Russian architects who would themselves be prominent one day including Ivan Starov and Vasili Bazhenov; under the impetus of Vallin de la Mothe, the promising young Russians were sent to Paris to apprentice with Charles De Wailly, thus setting a distinctively French stamp on Russian neoclassicism.

It is known that Vallin also redesigned interiors of the Winter Palace to Catherine II in 1762-1763.

Catherine the Great had been so impressed by his work at the Academy that she commissioned him to build an extension to her Winter Palace, which sits across the Neva River from the Academy. This would be Vallin de la Mothe's most famous work. The structure he built, known as the Small Hermitage, became the home to Catherine's art collection. This collection would eventually grow to be one of the world's largest— today Russia's Hermitage Museum holds over 3,000,000 pieces of art, and hundreds of thousands of tourists visit Vallin de la Mothe's Small Hermitage, along with the rest of the complex, every year.

From 1761 to 1767, he pursued a number of other projects. He designed St. Petersburg's market hall, Gostiny Dvor on Nevsky Prospekt (the main street of St. Petersburg), the palaces of Kirill Razumovsky, Ivan Chernyshyov, the House of Yusupov's Moika Palace (where Grigori Rasputin was murdered), and the New Holland Arch. In 1766 he officially became the court architect.

He began, but did not complete, work on the Catholic Church of St. Catherine. Work on the church was completed by Antonio Rinaldi.

=== Return to France ===
In 1775 Vallin de la Mothe left Russia and came back to France. He resided in Lyon, where he designed and constructed his own house. In 1782 due to poverty and serious illness he was forced to move back to his childhood city Angoulême. The great architect died there on 7 May 1800.

In France he created several urban buildings. The neoclassical hôtel particulier he designed in the 1780s for Louis Thomas de Bardines survives at 79 rue de Beaulieu.

== Gallery ==
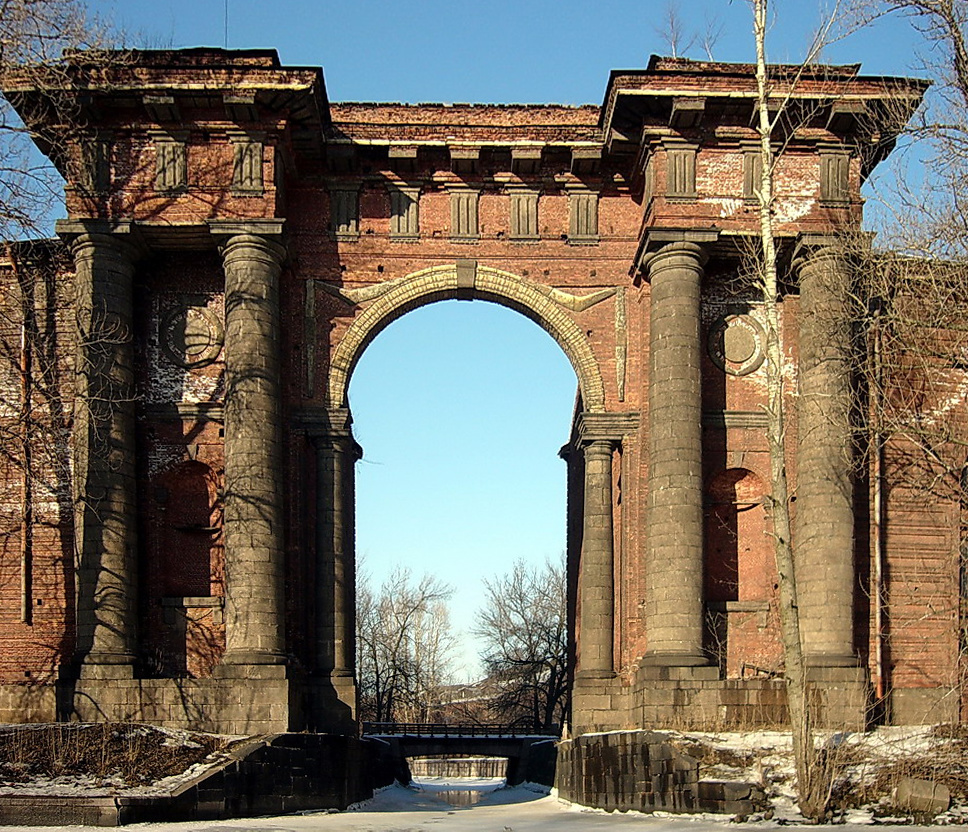
Arch of New Holland Island, Saint-Petersburg

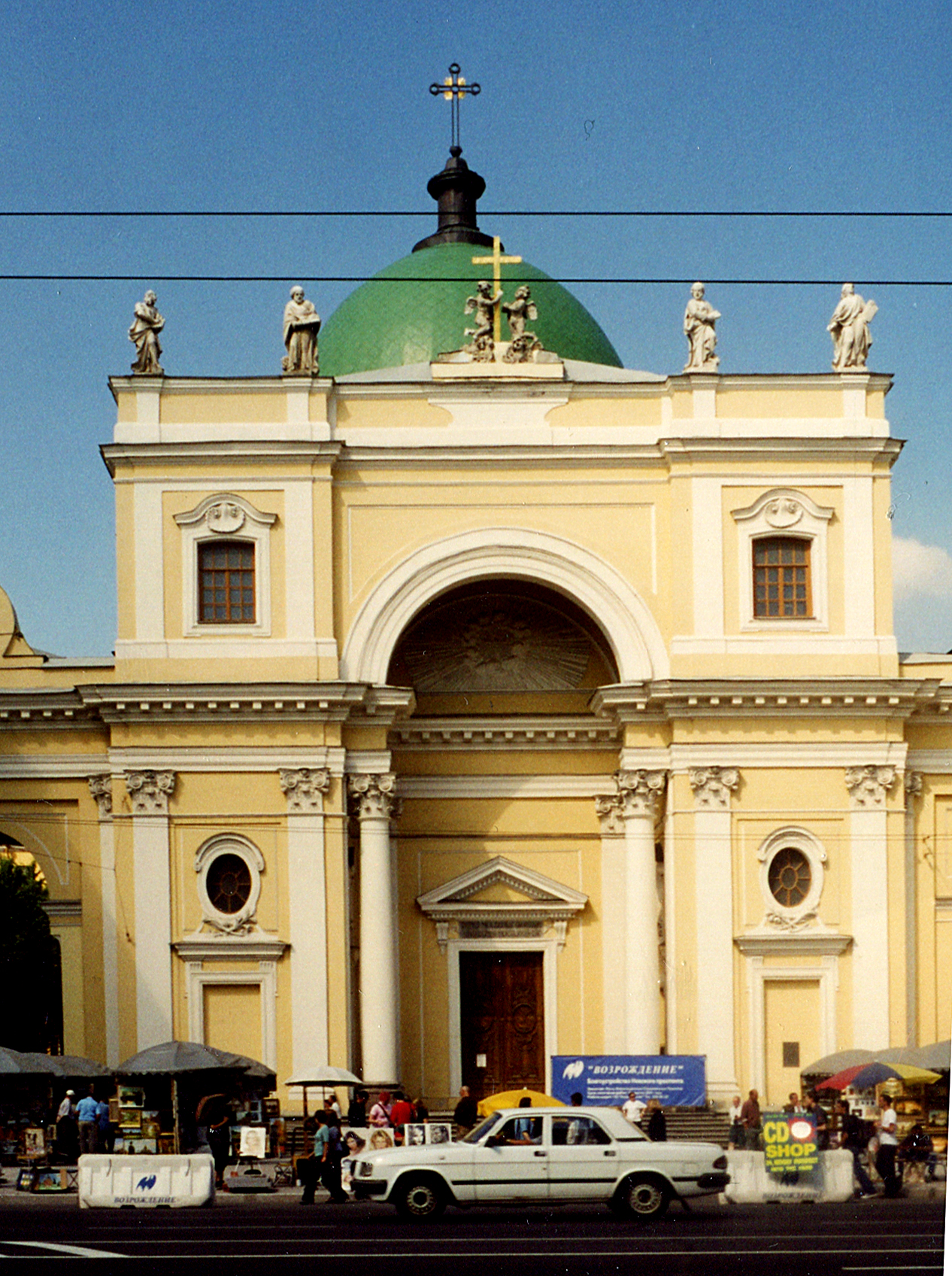
Catholic Church of St. Catherine, Saint-Petersburg

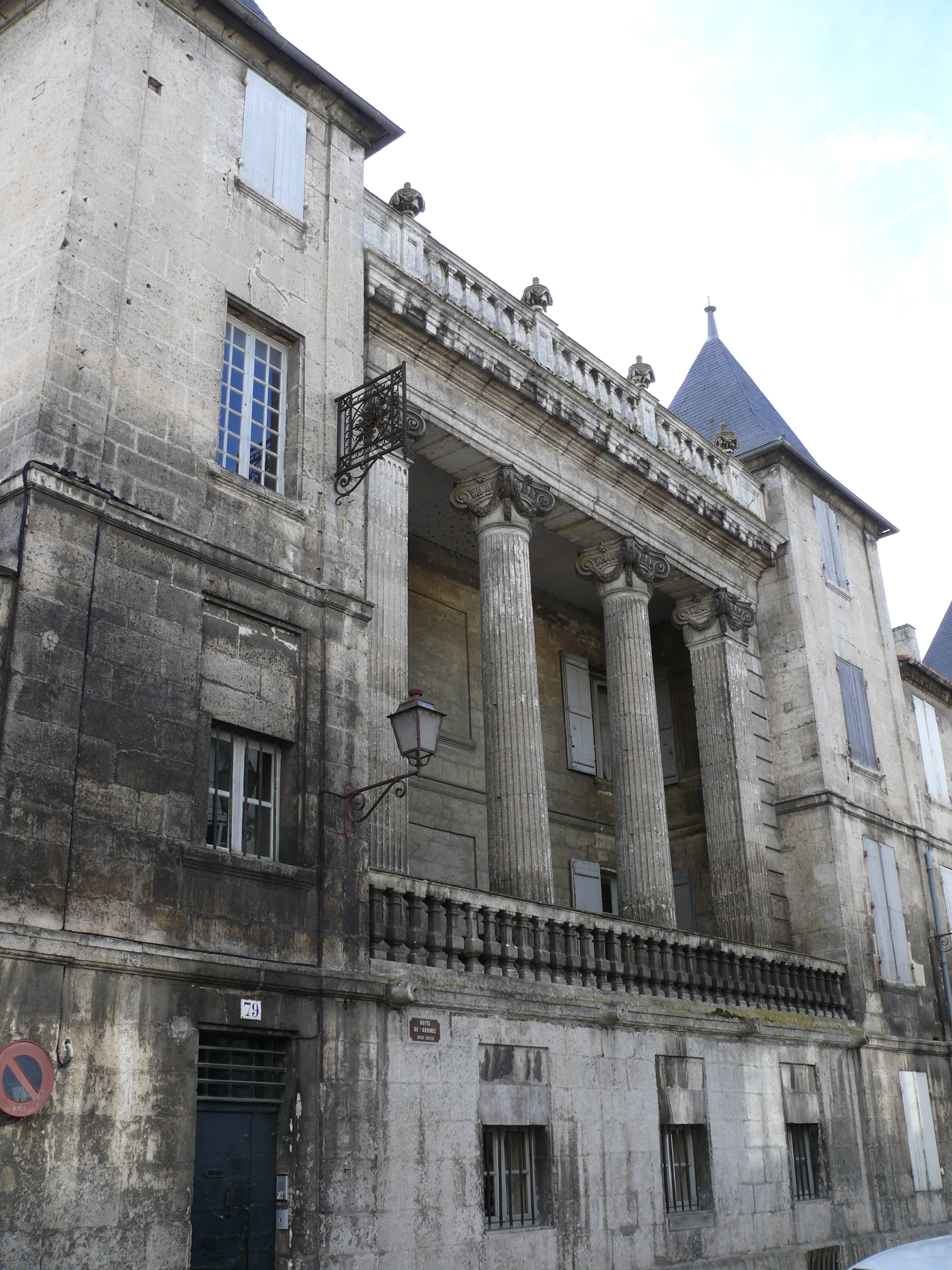
Hôtel de Bardines, Angoulême

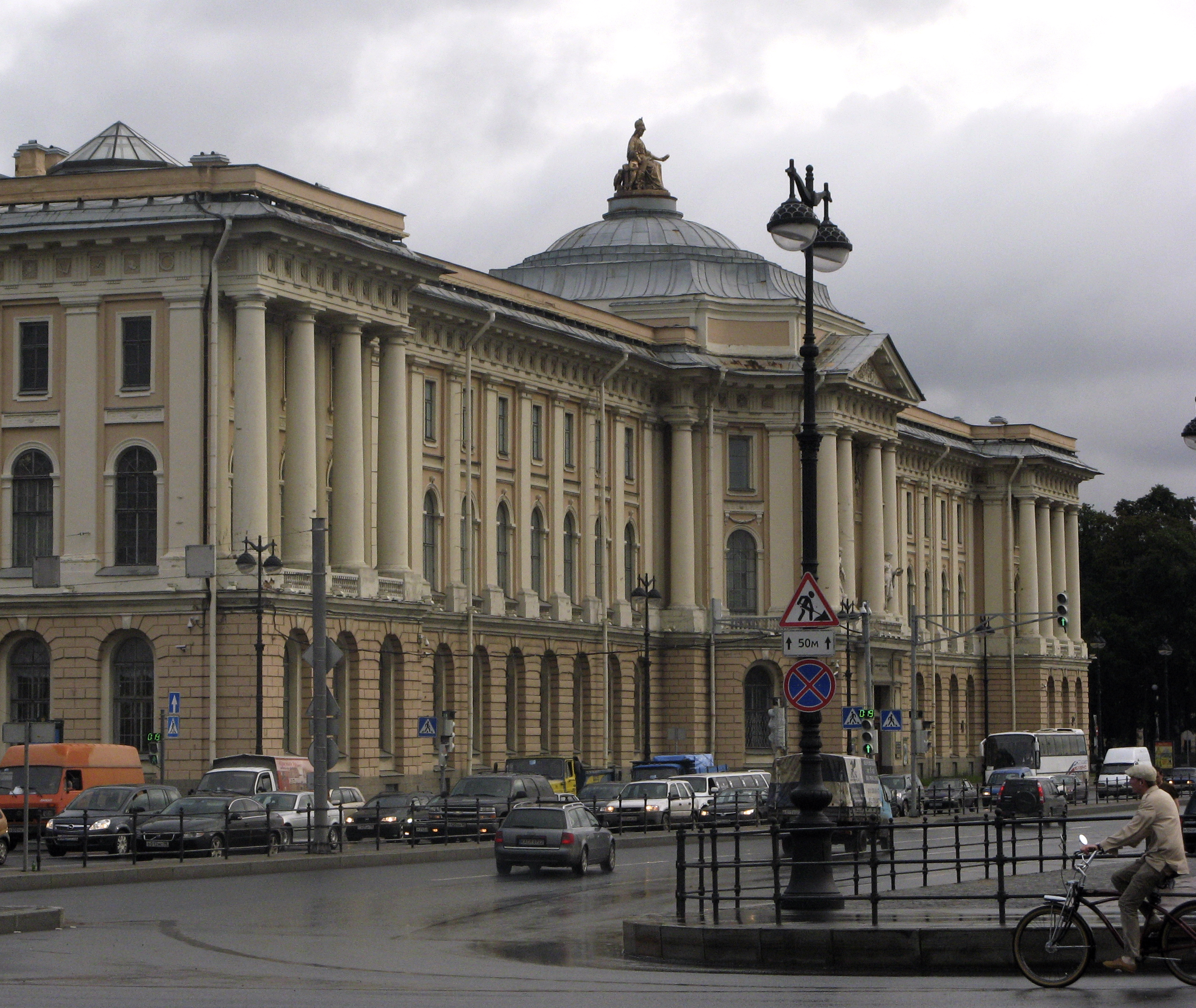
Imperial Academy of Arts, Saint-Petersburg

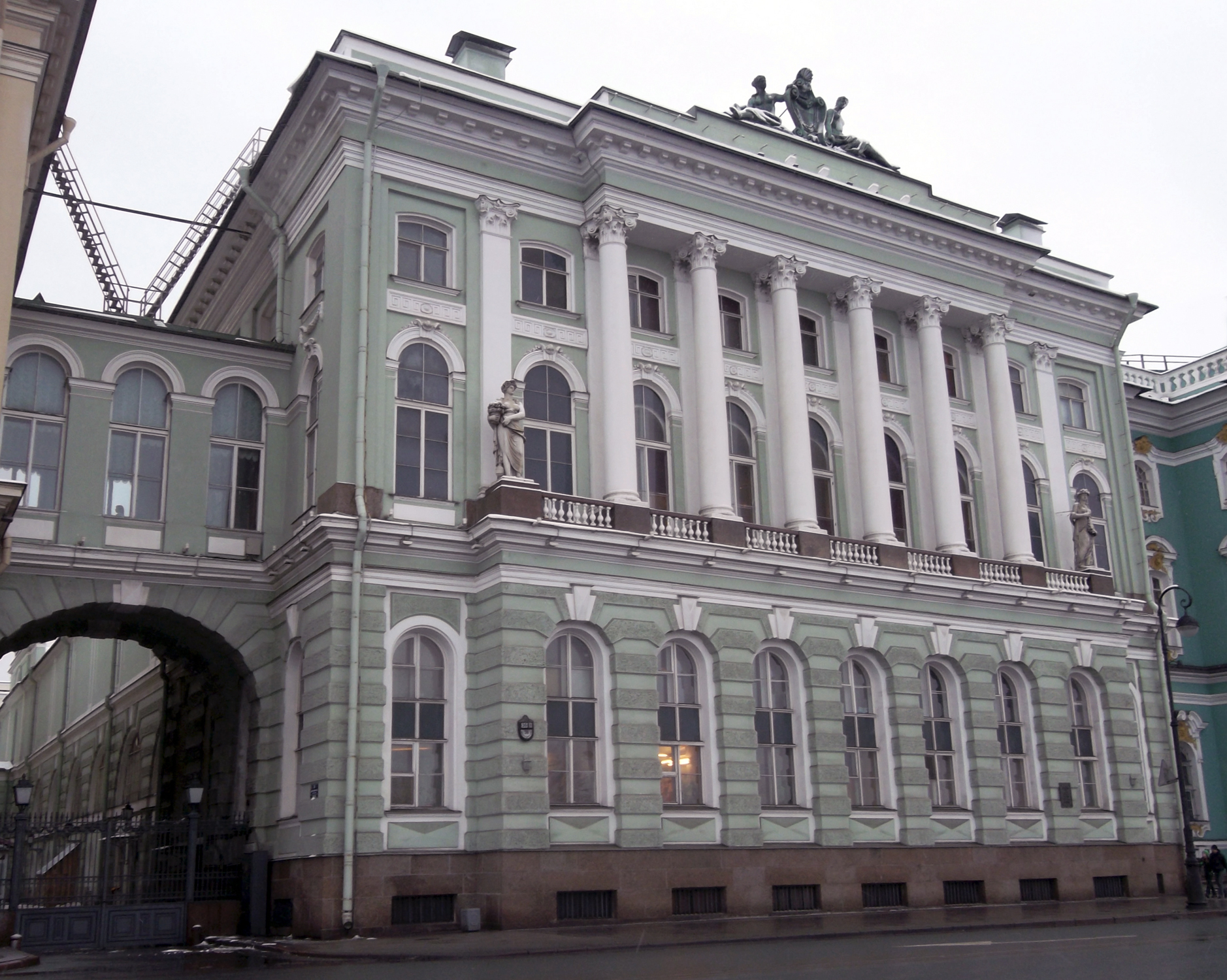
Small Hermitage, Saint-Petersburg

== Sources ==
- "Деламот, Валлен-, Жан-Батист-Мишель" . Brockhaus and Efron Encyclopedic Dictionary (in Russian). 1906.
- Shuysky, V. (1997). Зрелое русское барокко и ранний классицизм [Late Baroque and Early Classicism] (in Russian). SPb: ‘Chernoye i Beloye’ publishing house. pp. 73–105.
- Palmer, Allison Lee (2020). Historical Dictionary of Neoclassical Art and Architecture. London: Rowman&Littlefield. p. 303. ISBN 9781538133590.
- Dixon, Simon (2010). Catherine the Great. Profile Books. pp. 136–137. ISBN 978-1-84765-192-1.
- Massie, Robert K. (2011). Catherine the Great: Portrait of a Woman. New York: Random House. p. 524. ISBN 9781588360441.
- Shvidkovsky, Dmitrii (2007). Russian Architecture and the West. London: Yale University Press. p. 232. ISBN 978-0-300-10912-2.
