= Great Gostiny Dvor =

Shopping centre in St. Petersburg, Russia

Coordinates: 59°56′03″N 30°19′56″E

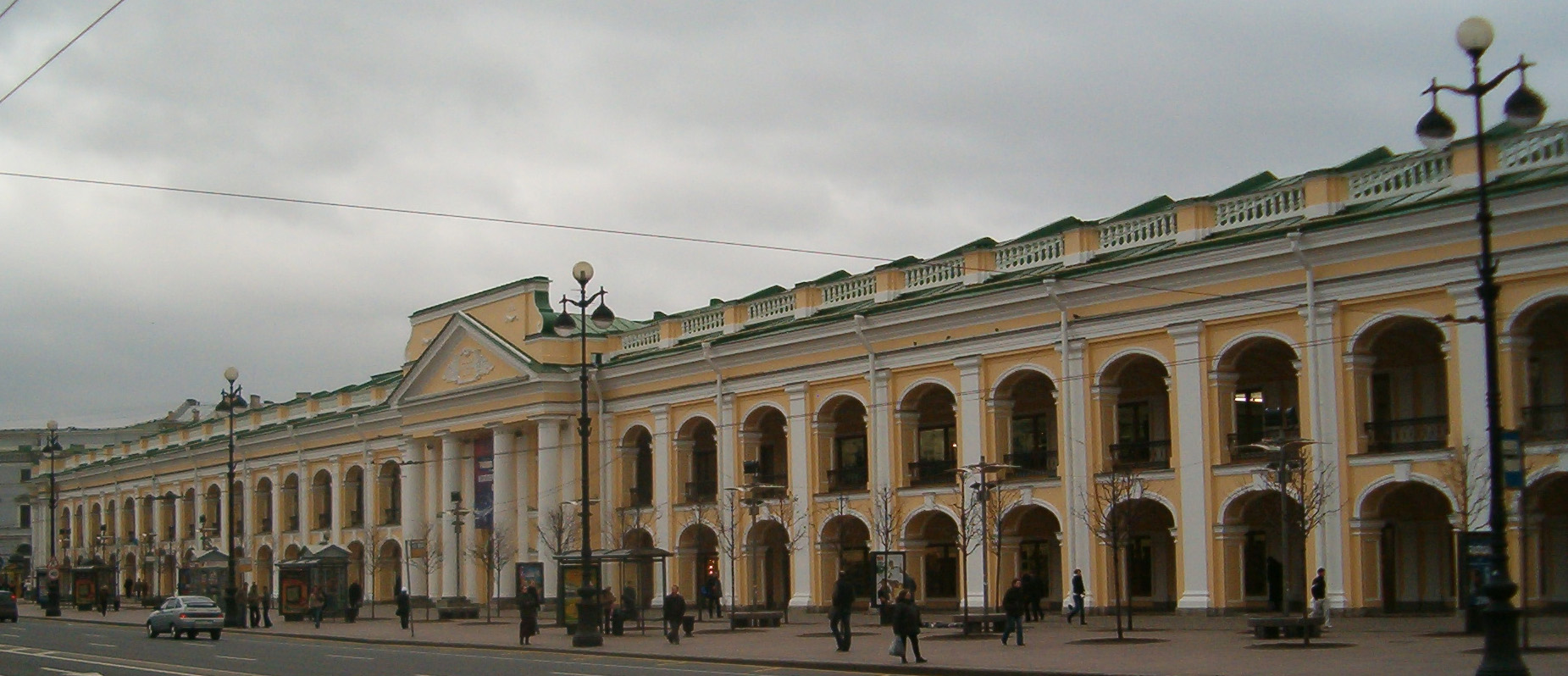
Great Gostiny Dvor in St Petersburg, 2008.

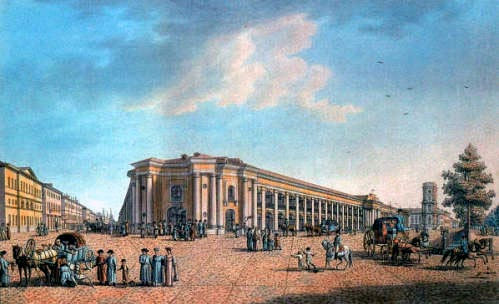
Great Gostiny Dvor in St Petersburg, 1802, by Benjamin Patersen.

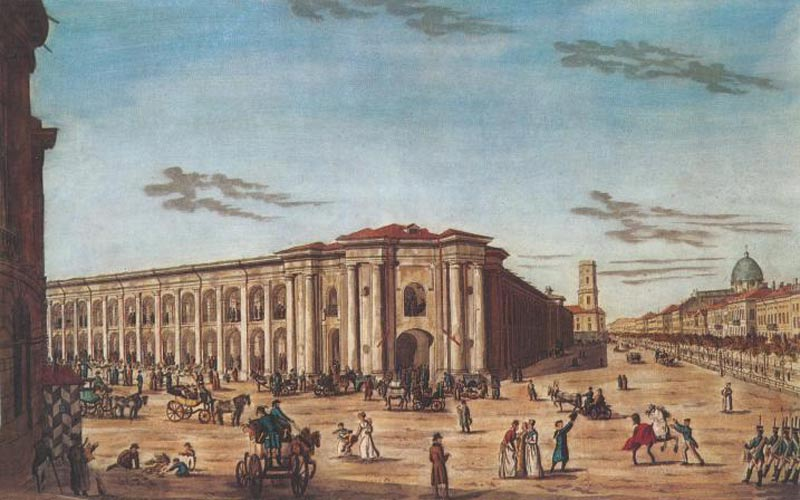
Great Gostiny Dvor in St Petersburg, 1815.

Great Gostiny Dvor (Russian: Большой Гостиный Двор) is a vast department store on Nevsky Avenue in St Petersburg, Russia.

This Gostiny Dvor is not only the city's oldest shopping centre, but also one of the first shopping arcades in the world. Sprawling at the intersection of Nevsky Prospekt and Sadovaya Street for over one kilometer and embracing the area of 53,000 m^{2} (570,000 sq ft), the indoor complex of more than 100 shops took twenty-eight years to construct. Building works commenced in 1757 to an elaborate design by Bartolomeo Rastrelli, but that subsequently was discarded in favour of a less expensive and more functional Neoclassical design submitted by Jean-Baptiste Vallin de la Mothe (1729–1800).

Throughout the following century, Gostiny Dvor was continuously augmented, resulting in ten indoor streets and as many as 178 shops by the 20th century. By that time, the Gostiny Dvor had lost its popularity to the more fashionable Passage and New Passage, situated on the Nevsky Prospekt nearby. During the post-World War II reconstructions, its inner walls were demolished and a huge shopping mall came into being. This massive 18th-century structure received a face-lift and entered the 21st century as one of the most fashionable shopping centres in Eastern Europe. A nearby station of Saint Petersburg Metro takes its name from Gostiny Dvor.
