= Moika Palace =

Palace in Saint Petersburg, Russia

- Дворец Юсуповых на Мойке
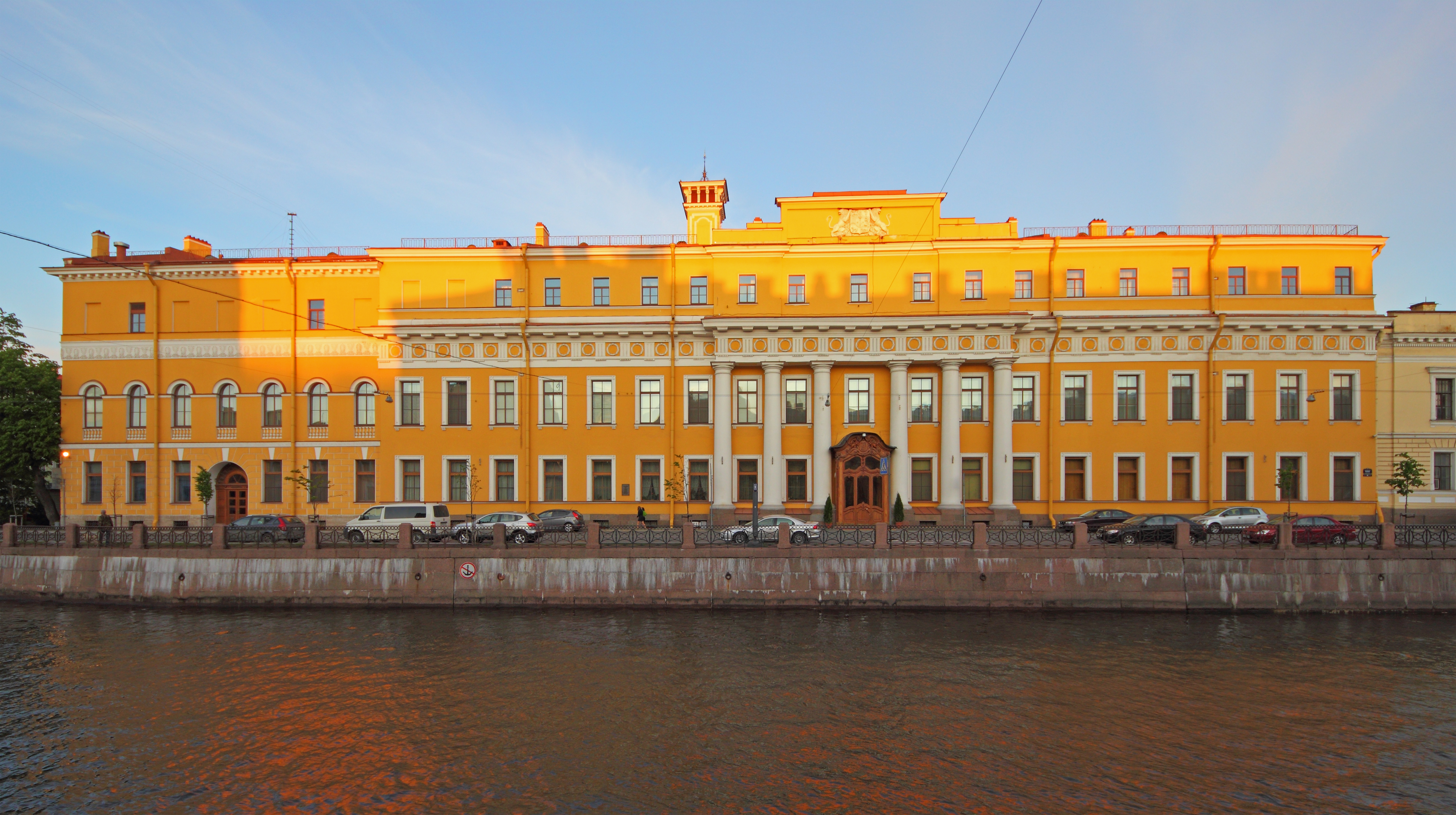
- The Yusupov Palace from across the Moika River
- Interactive map of the Moika Palace area

General information
- Location: St. Petersburg, Russia
- Coordinates: 59°55′46.2″N 30°17′55.32″E
- Completed: 1770

Design and construction
- Architect: Andrei Alexeievich Mikhailov

The Palace of the Yusupovs on the Moika (Russian: Дворец Юсуповых на Мойке), known as the Moika Palace or Yusupov Palace, is a former residence of the Russian noble House of Yusupov in St. Petersburg, Russia, now a museum. The building was the site of Grigori Rasputin's murder in the early morning of December 17, 1916. Sometimes called the Moika Palace to tell it apart from other palaces of the same family in Saint Petersburg, though it is not the only palace on this river in the city.

== Building ==
The palace was first built around 1776 by the French architect Jean-Baptiste Vallin de la Mothe. Over the years a number of architects worked on the palace including the famous Italian sculptor Emilio Sala, producing a variety of architectural styles. Andrei Mikhailov reconstructed the building in the 1830s after the princely Yusupov family acquired the property. This was the period in which the palace acquired its present-day appearance.

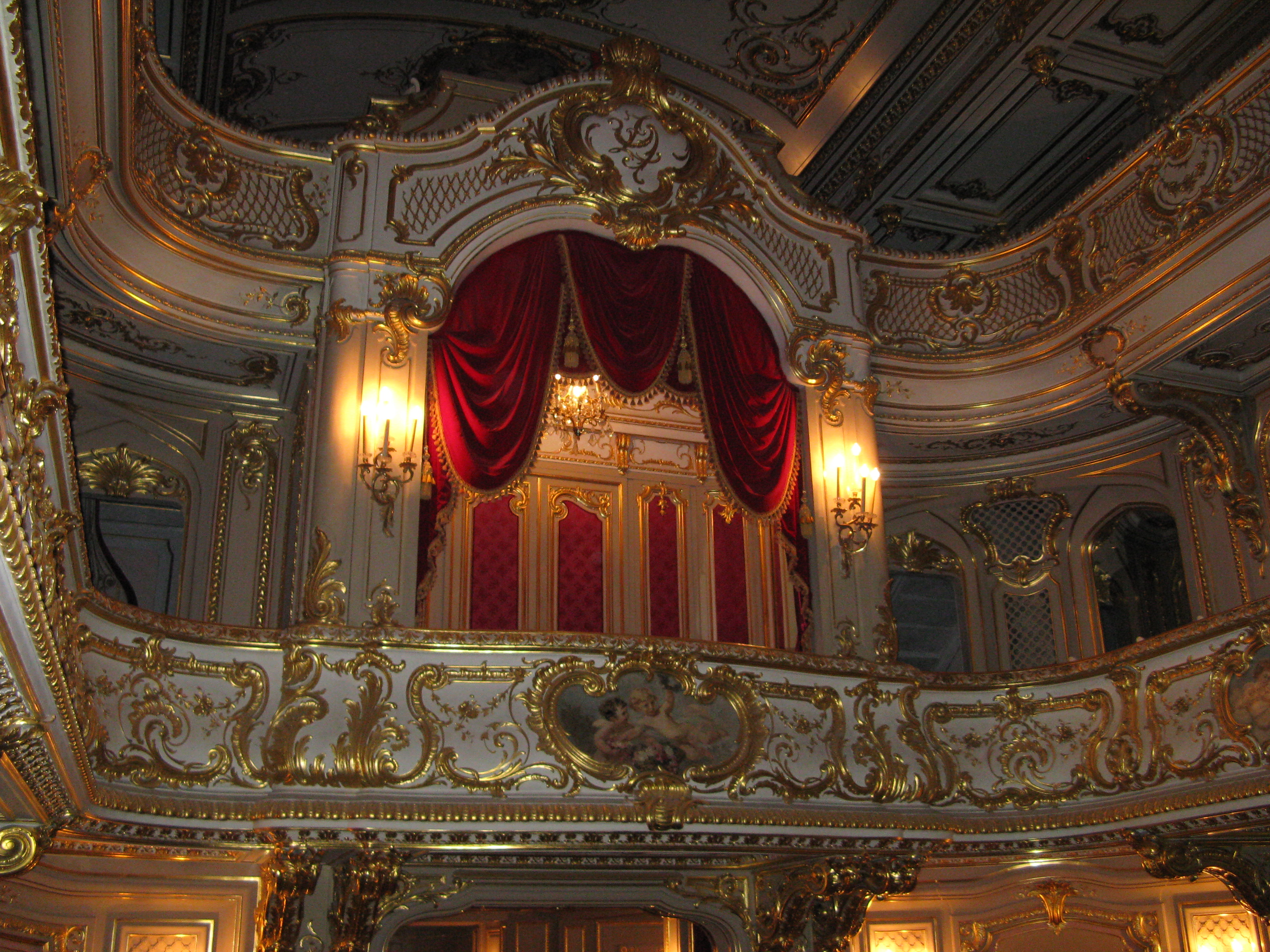
The palatial theatre.

The Yusupovs were immensely wealthy and known for their philanthropy and art collections. In this time, the palace became known as the Yusupov Palace.

The luxurious interiors of the palace were not inferior to those of contemporary royal palaces. More than 40,000 works of art, including works by Rembrandt, jewelry, and sculptures decorated the palace. Following the Russian Revolution, the palace was nationalised and its works of art were largely relocated to the Hermitage and other museums. Ernst Friedrich von Liphart, who was the curator of paintings at the Hermitage, had earlier painted the curtain and ceiling of the palace theatre.

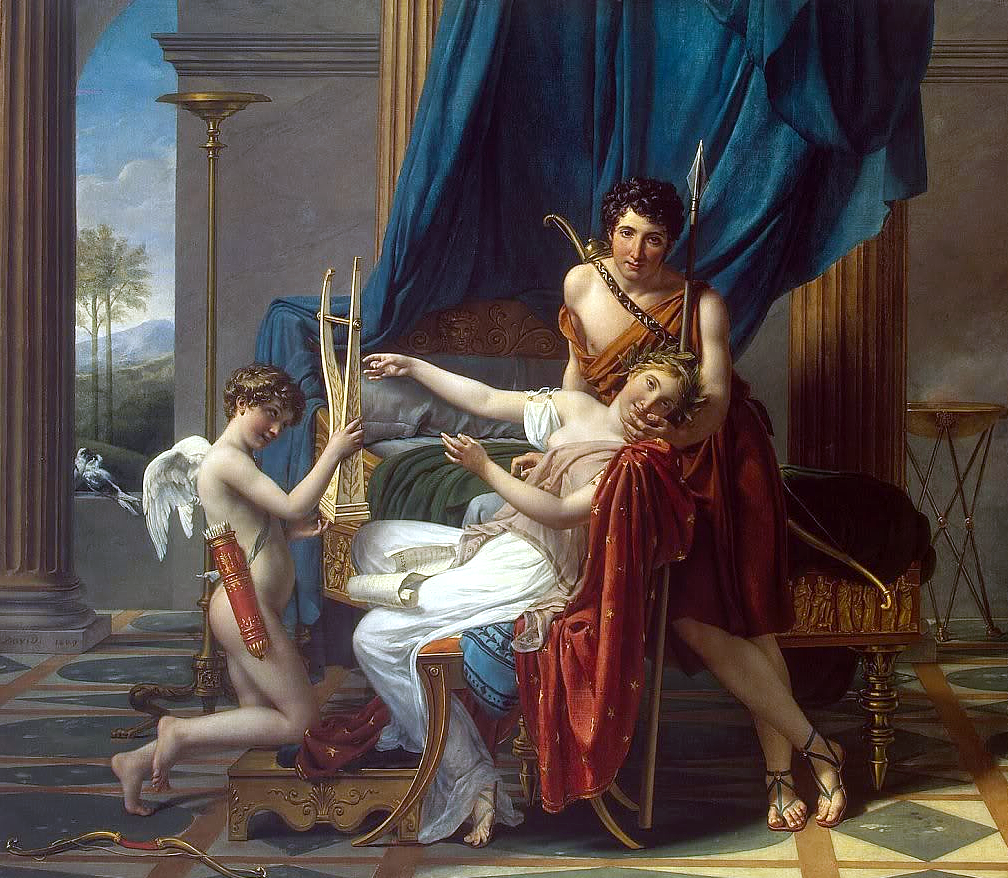
Sappho and Phaon. A painting by Jacques-Louis David from the Yusupov collection in the Moika Palace

== Murder of Rasputin ==
The palace was the scene of the assassination of Grigori Rasputin by a monarchist group which included Prince Felix Yusupov, heir to the vast Yusupov family estates. These included four palaces in St. Petersburg. The palace on the Moika was reportedly the prince's favorite residence in the capital.

The exact events surrounding Rasputin's death are still in dispute. What seems clear is that on 30 December [O.S. 17 December] 1916, Felix Yusupov, along with Vladimir Purishkevich and Grand Duke Dmitri Pavlovich invited Grigori Rasputin to the Moika Palace. He took Rasputin to a small but lavishly furnished cellar room of the palace. There he served Rasputin red wine. When Rasputin was affected, Yusupov retrieved a revolver and shot Rasputin from the side. Taking him for dead, Yusupov went upstairs to where the other conspirators waited in a ground floor study/drawing room. Rasputin succeeded in fleeing through a side door into a gated courtyard which opened onto the street outside. Purishkevich then shot Rasputin in the back, on the doorstep. The body was taken inside and a third bullet, fired at close range, entered his forehead. The conspirators wrapped Rasputin in a broadcloth, drove outside the city and threw the body into the Malaya Neva.

== Post-Revolution ==
The Russian Revolution followed shortly after Rasputin's death and once the Soviets came to power, they confiscated the property of the nobles. In 1925, the palace was handed over to the city's Education Commissariat. While most nobles' palaces were converted to mundane use, the Education Commissariat decided to preserve the mansion as a public museum. Today the palace serves as a "Palace of Culture for Educators". Second floor reception areas and that part of the building associated with Rasputin's murder, are maintained as a museum open to public tours. The courtyard where Rasputin attempted to flee from his killers is now occupied by a kindergarten playground adjacent to the main building.

== See also ==
- Arkhangelskoye Palace
- Yusupov Palace (Crimea)
