= Dvor, Visoko =

Dvor
- Village
- Location within Bosnia and Herzegovina
- Coordinates: 43.9403888°N 18.1955722°E
- Country: Bosnia and Herzegovina
- Entity: Federation of Bosnia and Herzegovina
- Canton: Zenica-Doboj
- Municipality: Visoko

Area
  - Total: 0.64 sq mi (1.67 km^{2})

Population (2013)
  - Total: 297
  - Density: 461/sq mi (178/km^{2})
- Time zone: UTC+1 (CET)
  - Summer (DST): UTC+2 (CEST)

Dvor is a village in the municipality of Visoko, Bosnia and Herzegovina.

== Demographics ==
According to the 2013 census, its population was 297.

Ethnicity in 2013
Ethnicity	Number	Percentage
Bosniaks	296	99.7%
Serbs	1	0.03%
Total	297	100%
