= Kostroma Gostiny Dvor =

Coordinates: 57°45′58″N 40°55′35″E

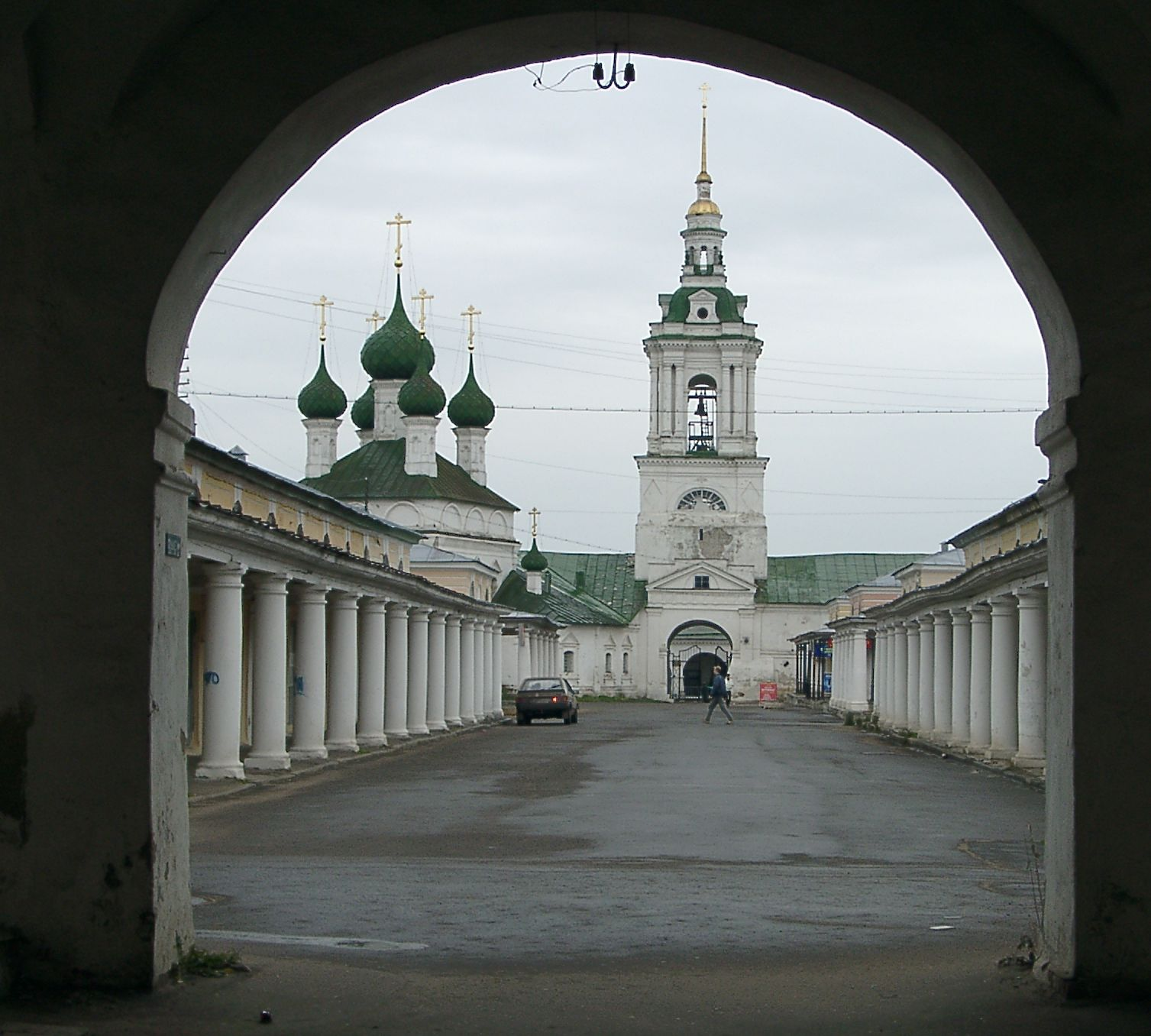
The Saviour Church in the Trading Rows

The Gostiny Dvor in Kostroma is the best preserved complex of provincial Neoclassical trading arcades in Russia. It was built on the site of the ancient Kostroma kremlin after the great fire of 1773. The complex comprises more than ten buildings constructed over a period of almost five decades.

The merchant court was designed by Charles Claire, although many other architects (including Vasily Stasov) modified the original design. The construction was supervised by the local Vorotilov family. Each arch was occupied by a separate shop or tavern. The ground floor was for trade, whereas the second and third storeys were for storage and general warehousing.

The centerpiece of the inner trade square is the five-domed Saviour church (1766) with a distinctive tall belltower. The white obelisks flanking the main entrance were erected to commemorate a royal visit to the city in 1823.
