= Drolls (Russian early music ensemble) =

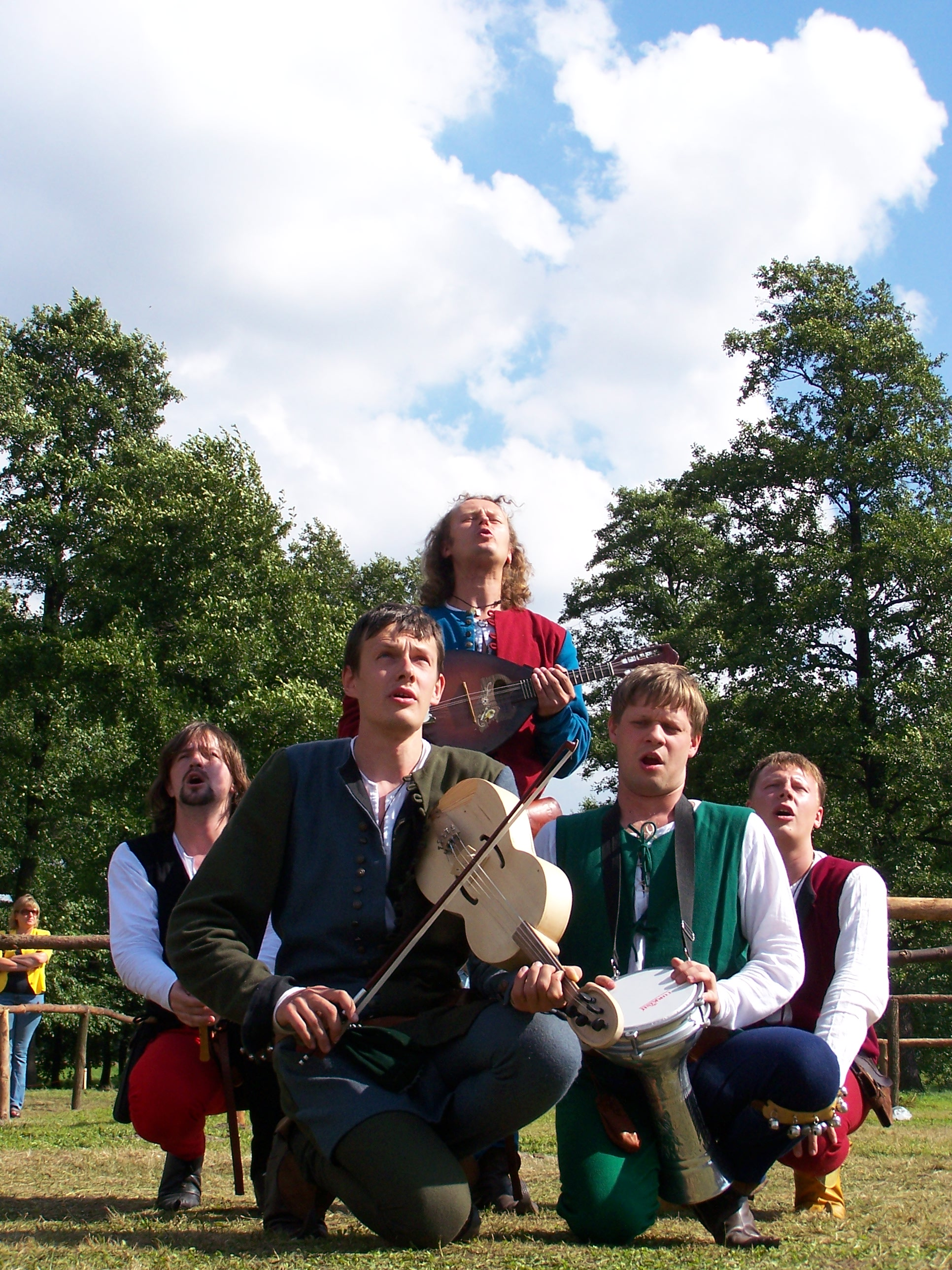

Background information
- Origin: Russia
- Genres: Early music, Renaissance music
- Years active: 1999-present
- Website: http://drolls.onego.ru/

Drolls is a Russian early music ensemble formed in 1999 and playing its own interpretation of Medieval and Renaissance music, using authentic instruments. The name of the ensemble refers to a droll - a short comical sketch of a type that originated during the Puritan Interregnum in England. Although their main repertoire consists of music and songs from across the Europe, they also sing and play music of skomorokchs.

The first album simply named "Drolls" was released in 2000, and shortly after that, in the beginning of 2001, was released the second album named "Kalenda Maya".

In 2006 Drolls together with the Belarusian ethno-band Guda recorded the album called "Zara", in which kupala and harvest songs are mixed with French estampie, Macedonian dances and much more. The result can be described as a world music in a way.

The same year Drolls were engaged in another project, and tried themselves both as both musicians and actors in the medieval play, which is based on poems of the famous manuscript Carmina Burana. The play is set in a medieval tavern, where its main characters discuss quite serious matters over a pint.

In 2007 the ensemble members appeared as actors yet again, but this time as medieval Slavic performers - skomorokhs in the historical movie "Alexander. Nevskaya Bitva" dedicated to Alexander Nevsky (1221-1263). The short performance musicians made for the film laid the foundation of their new program which was quite different to what they did before. And in the end of 2007 Drolls presented their new concert program called "Люди Веселы" (Skomorokhs) in Moscow, which was followed by release of the new album in 2008.

For musicians playing European music this was a move back to their roots, as main characters here are Slavic street performers, playing music very characteristic for those kind of performers and using more than 20 authentic music instruments of XIV—XVII centuries Russia.

In 2009 Drolls released their last studio album to the date, called "Decimus" (The Tenth).

In the following years Drolls devoted themselves more to an artistic collaboration. In 2014 together with the Petrozavodsk State University Choir they presented a new program called "Cantigas". This was quite a success, so in 2018 Drolls and the University Choir presented their second joint music project called "Codex Buranus".

In the beginning of 2019 appeared another joint project, but this time together with "Onego" folk instruments orchestra, in which two ensembles presented new remastered versions of pieces from the Skomorokhs program.

In the end of 2019, for the ensemble's 20th birthday, Drolls and Petrozavodsk State Glazunov Conservatoire orchestra presented a project called Danza della Morte Nera.

== Members ==
- Dmitry Cherevko (cornamuse, flutes, jew's harp, vocal)
- Alexey Nikitin (djembe, goblet drum, glockenspiel, vocal)
- Pavel Popov (oboe, English horn, rauschpfeife, vocal)
- Igor Solovyev (mandolin, kantele, vocal)
- Sergei Popov (viola, rebec, jouhikko, vocal)

== Discography ==
- Drolls, 2000
- Kalenda Maya, 2001
- Carminis Vagantibus, 2003
- Via Sacra, 2004
- Quintus, 1999—2004
- Zara (recorded in collaboration with Guda, ethnic band from Belarus), 2006
- DVD Carmina Burana (medieval play based on poems and texts of Carmina Burana), 2007
- Люди Веселы (Skomorokhs), 2008
- Decimus, 2009
- Cantigas, 2014 (concert DVD)
- Codex Buranus, 2019 (concert DVD)
