= Petrozavodsk =

Capital city of Republic of Karelia, Russia

Petrozavodsk Петрозаводск
- City

Other transcription(s)
  - Karelian: Petroskoi
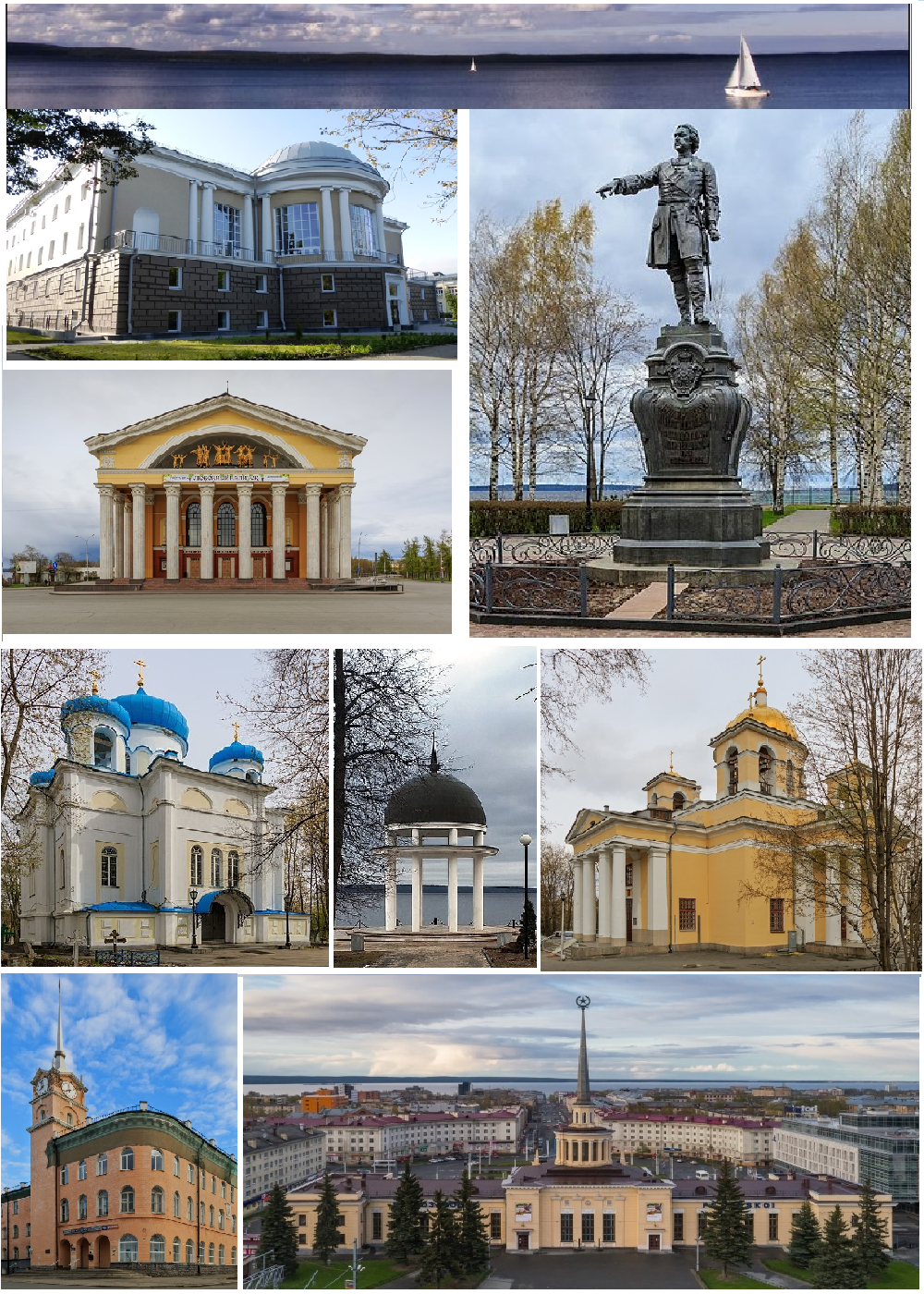
- Petrozavodsk Bay, National Library of Karelia, Music Theater, Monument to Peter I, Church of Exaltation of Holy Cross on Zaretskoe Cemetery, Roundabout on the embankment of Lake Onega, Alexander Nevsky Cathedral, Main post office, Railway station

- Flag Coat of arms
- Interactive map of Petrozavodsk
- Location of Petrozavodsk Petrozavodsk (European Russia) Petrozavodsk (Russia) Petrozavodsk (Europe)
- Coordinates: 61°47′N 34°20′E
- Country: Russia
- Federal subject: Republic of Karelia
- Founded: 1703
- City status since: March 21, 1777

Government
  - Body: City Council
  - Mayor: Inna Kolykhmatova

Area
  - Total: 135 km^{2} (52 sq mi)
- Elevation: 60 m (200 ft)

Population (2010 Census)
  - Total: 261,987
  - Estimate (2025): 234,577 (−10.5%)
  - Rank: 71st in 2010
  - Density: 1,940/km^{2} (5,030/sq mi)

Administrative status
  - Subordinated to: city of republic significance of Petrozavodsk
  - Capital of: Republic of Karelia
  - Capital of: city of republic significance of Petrozavodsk, Prionezhsky District

Municipal status
  - Urban okrug: Petrozavodsky Urban Okrug
  - Capital of: Petrozavodsky Urban Okrug, Prionezhsky Municipal District
- Time zone: UTC+3 (UTC+03:00)
- Postal codes: 185000–185003, 185005, 185007, 185009–185016, 185019, 185023, 185026, 185028, 185030–185035, 185700, 185890, 185899, 185910, 185960–185963, 185965, 185970, 185980–185983, 185985
- Dialing code: +7 8142
- OKTMO ID: 86701000001
- City Day: Last Saturday of June
- Website: www.petrozavodsk-mo.ru

Petrozavodsk (Note: Russian: Петрозаводск, IPA: [pʲɪtrəzɐˈvotsk]; Karelian, Veps and Finnish: Petroskoi; Ludian: Petrouskoi.) is the capital and largest city of the Republic of Karelia, Russia, which stretches along the western shore of Lake Onega for some 27 kilometers (17 mi). The population of the city is 280,890 as of 2022.

== Etymology ==
The name of the city means "Peter's factory"; it is a combination of words Peter (after Peter the Great) and zavod ('factory').

It was previously known as Shuysky Zavod (1703–1704) and Petrovskaya Sloboda (1704–1777), which was the first name of the city related to Peter the Great. It was renamed to Petrozavodsk after Catherine the Great granted the settlement the status of a city in 1777.

It was unofficially planned in the 1930s to rename the city to Gyllinggrad, (lit. 'Gylling's city') in honor of the long-time leader of the Karelian ASSR, Edvard Gylling. However, Gylling quickly became unpopular amongst Soviet authorities during the same decade and ended up being executed as part of the Great Purge, leading to the city never being renamed. Petrozavodsk is sometimes referred to as Kalininsk, after Mikhail Kalinin, in some older Soviet-era maps, regardless of the city never officially having such a name.

An ancient Swedish name was Onegaborg, known from a map from 1592 of the Flemish cartographer Abraham Ortelius, and hence translated to Finnish as Äänislinna, a name used during the occupation of Eastern Karelia by Finnish forces during the Continuation War (1941–1944) in the context of World War II.

== History ==
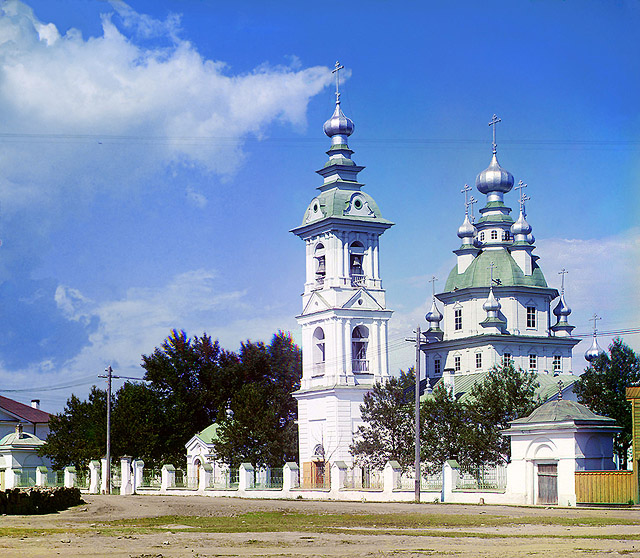
A church in Petrozavodsk, as photographed ca. 1912 by Sergey Prokudin-Gorsky

Archeological discoveries in the urban area indicate the presence of a settlement as far back as seven thousand years ago, and during the Middle Ages the site of modern city was marked by several lakeside villages. Within the city limits, the district of Solomennoje appears in surviving records dating back to the sixteenth century, and a map produced by the Flemish cartographer Abraham Ortelius at the end of that century places a settlement here called Onegaborg on the site of modern Petrozavodsk.

On 11 September 1703, Prince Menshikov founded the settlement of Petrovskaya Sloboda ("Petrine Sloboda"). He did so at the behest of Tsar Peter the Great, who needed a new iron foundry to manufacture cannons and anchors for the Baltic Fleet at the time of the Great Northern War (1700–1721). At first, the foundry used the name Shuysky zavod (literally, "factory at the Shuya River"), but a decade later it became Petrovsky zavod ("Petrine factory"), after the name of the reigning monarch. From this form the present name of the city derives.

By 1717, Petrovskaya Sloboda had grown into the largest settlement in Karelia, with about 3,500 inhabitants, a timber fort, a covered market, and miniature palaces of the Tsar and Menshikov. The town's best-known landmark became the wooden church of Saint Peter and Saint Paul, which was rebuilt in 1772 and renovated in 1789. The church retained its original iconostasis until this relic of the Tsar Peter the Great's reign was destroyed by fire on October 30, 1924.

After Peter's death, Petrovskaya Sloboda became depopulated and the factory declined. It closed down in 1734, although foreign industrialists maintained copper factories in the vicinity.

The industry revived in 1773 when Catherine the Great established a new iron foundry upstream the Lososinka River. Designed to provide cannons for the ongoing Russo-Turkish Wars, the foundry was named Alexandrovsky, after Alexander Nevsky, who was considered a patron saint of the region. The factory was modernized and expanded under supervision of Charles Gascoigne in 1787–96. Local pundits claim that the first railway in the world (чугунный колесопровод) was inaugurated for industrial uses of the Alexandrovsky foundry in 1788.

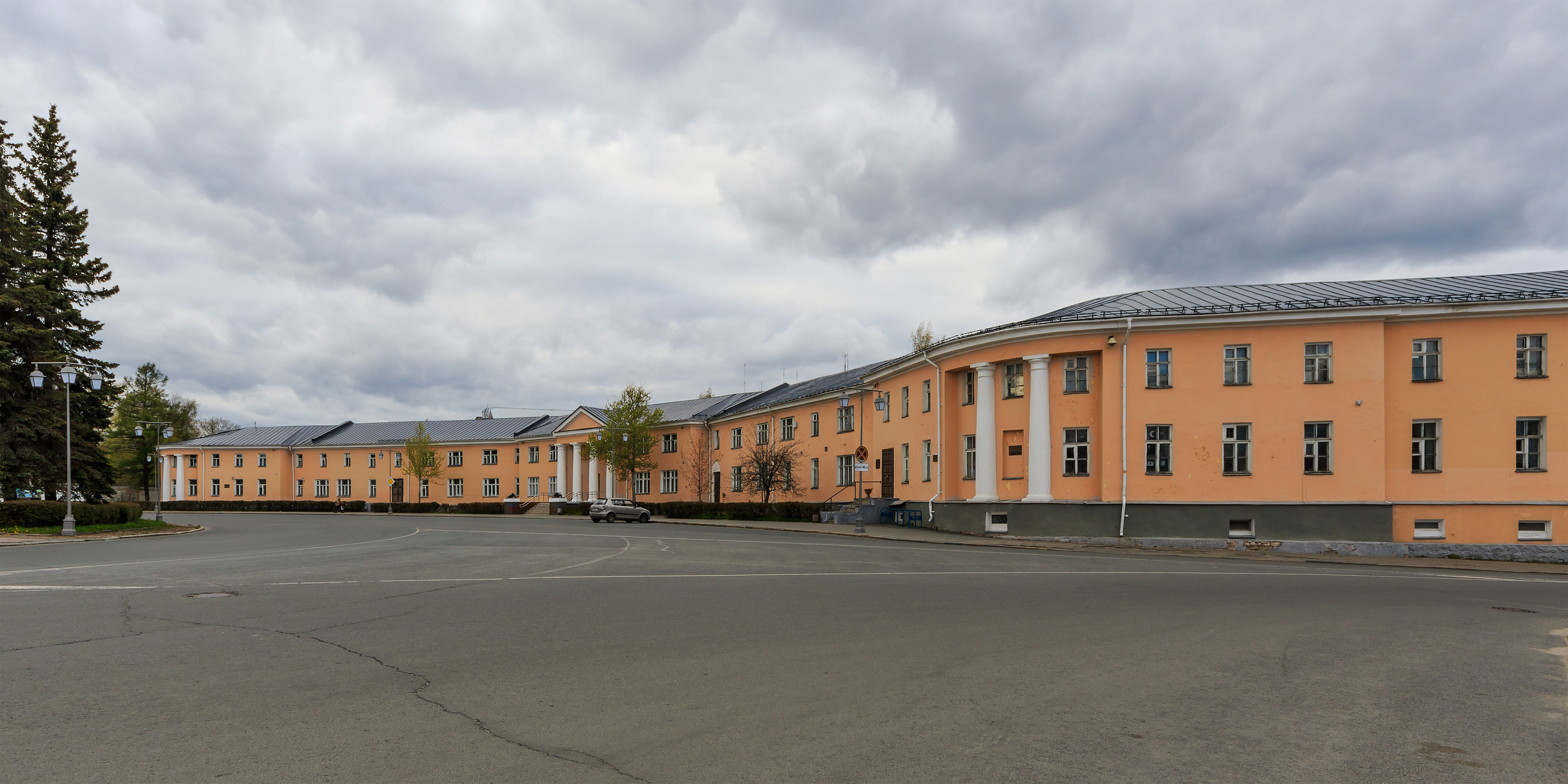
Round Square in central Petrozavodsk

During Catherine's municipal reform of 1777, Petrovskaya Sloboda was incorporated as a town, whereupon its name was changed to Petrozavodsk. A new Neoclassical city center was then built, focused on the newly planned Round Square. In 1784, Petrozavodsk was large enough to supplant Olonets as the administrative center of the region. Although Emperor Paul abolished Olonets Governorate, it was revived as a separate guberniya in 1801, with Petrozavodsk as its administrative center.

In 1992, a commemorative site was created in the Zaretskoe churchyard for several hundred who had been shot during the Great Terror.

During the Finnish occupation in the Continuation War (1941–1944), the city was styled as Äänislinna (or Ääneslinna), rather than the traditional Petroskoi. This name was a literal translation of Onegaborg, the name of a settlement marked on a 16th-century map by Abraham Ortelius near the present-day city, Ääninen being the Finnish toponym for Lake Onega. On 14 October 1941, the Finnish authorities opened the first concentration camp. By the recapture of Petrozavodsk there were 11 concentration camps.

In 1977, Petrozavodsk was the epicenter of what is called the Petrozavodsk phenomenon.

Historical population
Year	Pop.	±%
1897	13,000	—
1926	25,989	+99.9%
1939	69,723	+168.3%
1959	135,256	+94.0%
1970	184,481	+36.4%
1979	234,103	+26.9%
1989	269,485	+15.1%
2002	266,160	−1.2%
2010	261,987	−1.6%
2021	234,897	−10.3%
Source: Census data

== Administrative and municipal status ==
Petrozavodsk is the capital of the republic and, within the framework of administrative divisions, it also serves as the administrative center of Prionezhsky District, even though it is not a part of it. As an administrative division, it is incorporated separately as the city of republic significance of Petrozavodsk—an administrative unit with the status equal to that of the administrative divisions of the Republic of Karelia. As a municipal division, the city of republic significance of Petrozavodsk is incorporated as Petrozavodsky Urban Okrug.

== Politics ==
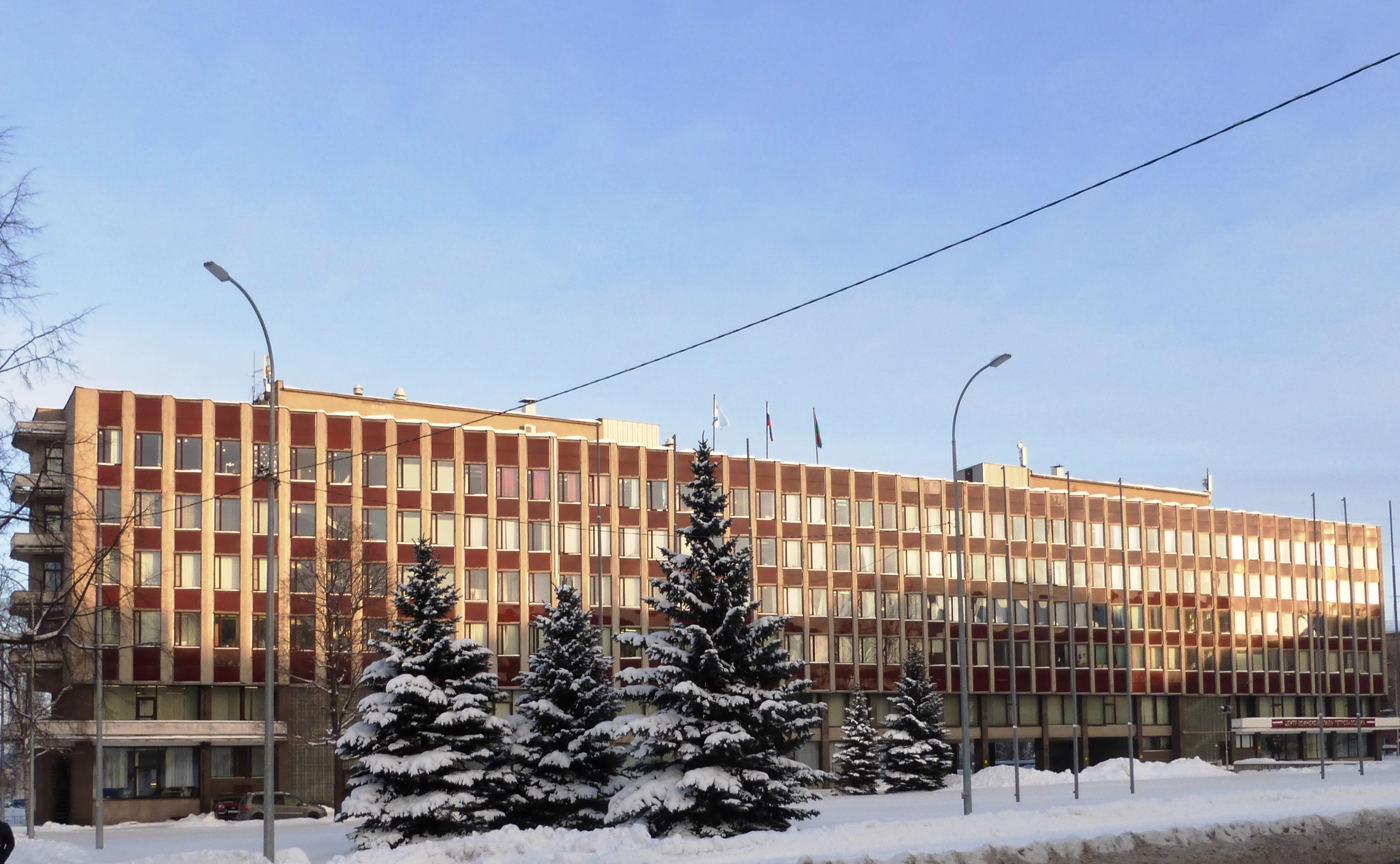
The administration and the Petrozavodsk council occupy the building at 2 Lenin Prospect

The Petrozavodsk city council is a representative body of the city district, consisting of 28 deputies elected for five years according to a mixed system - 14 by party lists and 14 by single-member constituencies. The current membership was elected in the elections on 19 September 2021. On 7 October 2021, Nadezhda Dreyzis (United Russia) was elected Chairman of the City Council.

== Landmarks ==
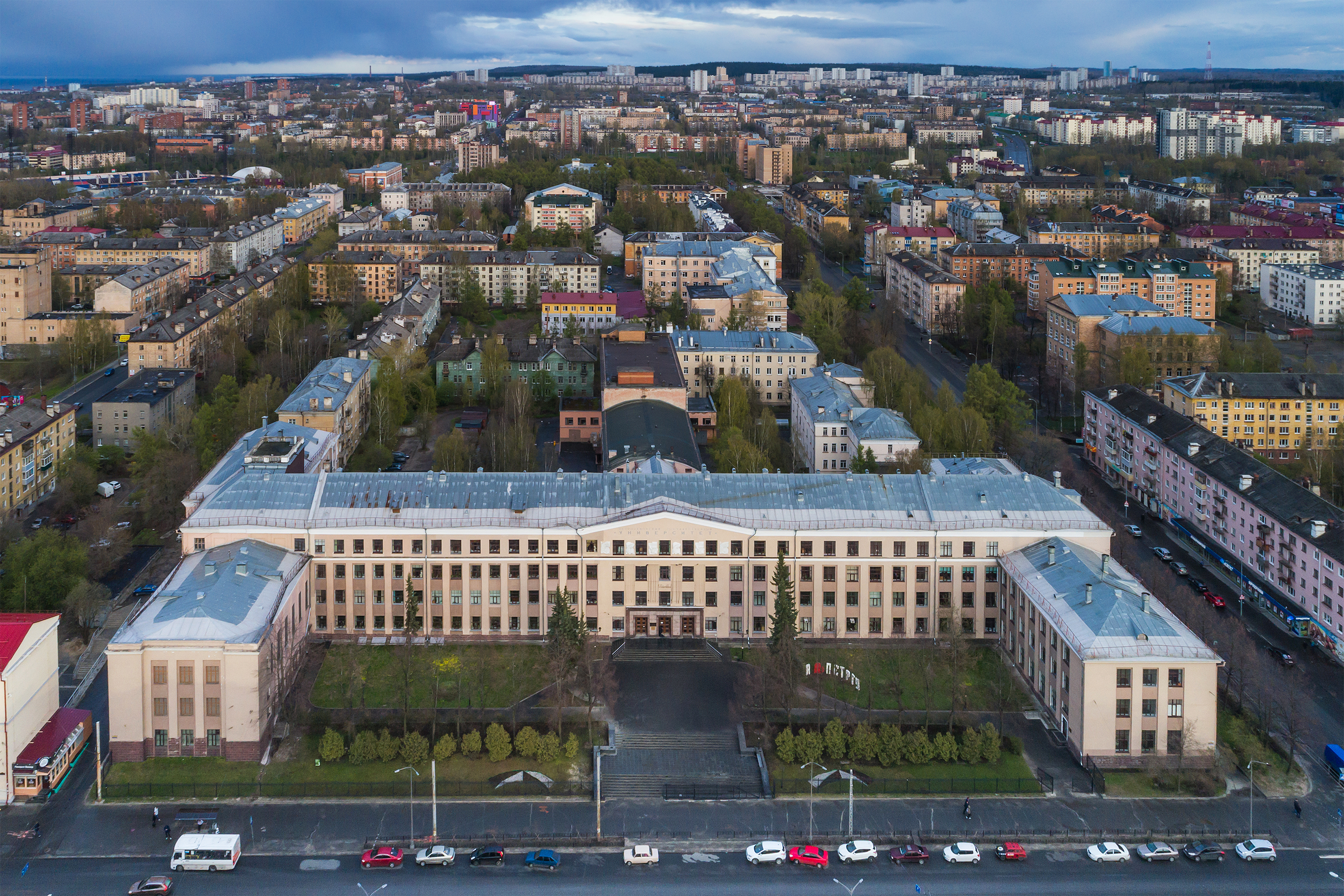
The Petrozavodsk State University

Petrozavodsk is distinguished among other towns of North Russia by its Neoclassical architectural heritage, which includes the Round Square (1775, reconstructed in 1789 and 1839) and the Alexander Nevsky Cathedral (consecrated in 1832). Among the town's landmarks are the outdoor statues of Peter I (bronze and granite, Ippolit Monighetti, 1873), Gavrila Derzhavin (a Russian poet who was the governor of Olonets in the 18th century), and Alexander Nevsky (erected outside Alexander Nevsky Cathedral in 2010).

The city has a fine frontage on the Gulf of Petrozavodsk. The modern embankment, inaugurated in 1994, displays an assortment of Karelian granites and marbles. It is lined with extravagant postmodernist sculptures presented by sister cities of Petrozavodsk from around the world. There is also a birch copse, where the first church of Petrozavodsk was built in 1703.

Petrozavodsk is home to the Karelia Philharmonic Orchestra (1933), the Karelian Musical Theater (1955, statuary by Sergey Konenkov), National Library of Karelia (1959), Finnish-speaking National Theatre of Karelia (1965), Petrozavodsk State University, a conservatory, National Museum of the Republic of Karelia founded in 1871, and a branch of the Russian Academy of Sciences.

One of the city's central landmarks is Lenin Square, an oval space with a large Soviet-era statue of Lenin in the center. The square is especially notable for English-speaking visitors because it is also called "round square" - an oxymoron in English, but not in Russian (kruglaya ploshad).

== Suburbs ==
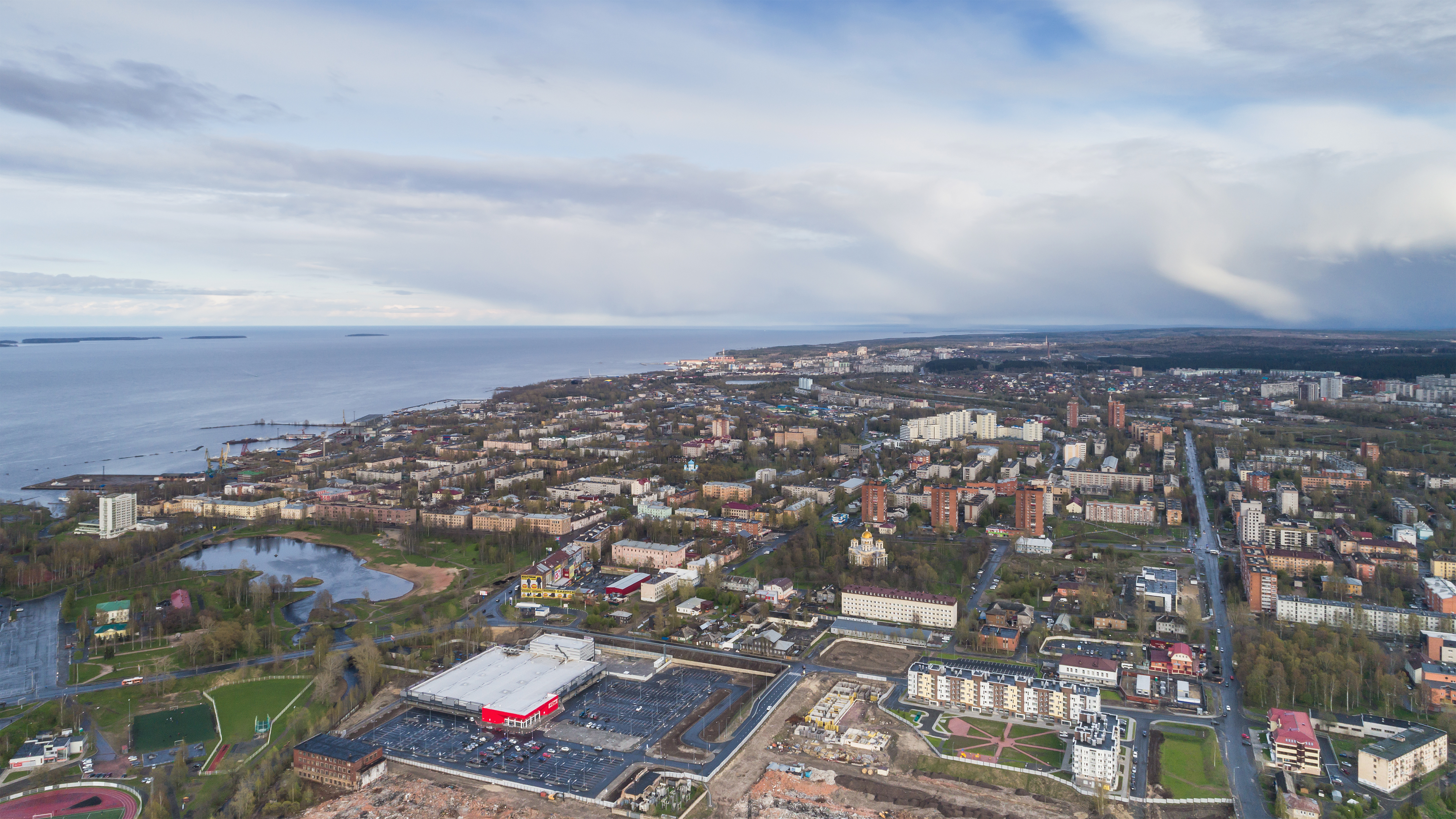
Aerial view of Petrozavodsk

The village of Shoksha near Petrozavodsk contains a quarry of red and pink quartzite (Shoksha quartzite) which was used in construction of Saint Isaac's Cathedral and Lenin Mausoleum, among many other notable structures. There are also other quarries in the region excavating road aggregates (Goloday Gora – gabbro-diabase) near Derevyanka.

The suburb of Martsialnye Vody is the oldest spa in Russia, founded by Peter the Great in 1714 and visited by the Tsar on four occasions. Its name means "The Waters of Mars" in Russian. Although Peter's palace at Martsialnye Vody has not survived, there is a museum devoted to the spa's history.

From Petrozavodsk Harbor, a hydrofoil service of "KareliaFlot" company carries people to the island of Kizhi, a World Heritage Site with an outdoor museum of ancient wooden architecture.

== Transportation ==
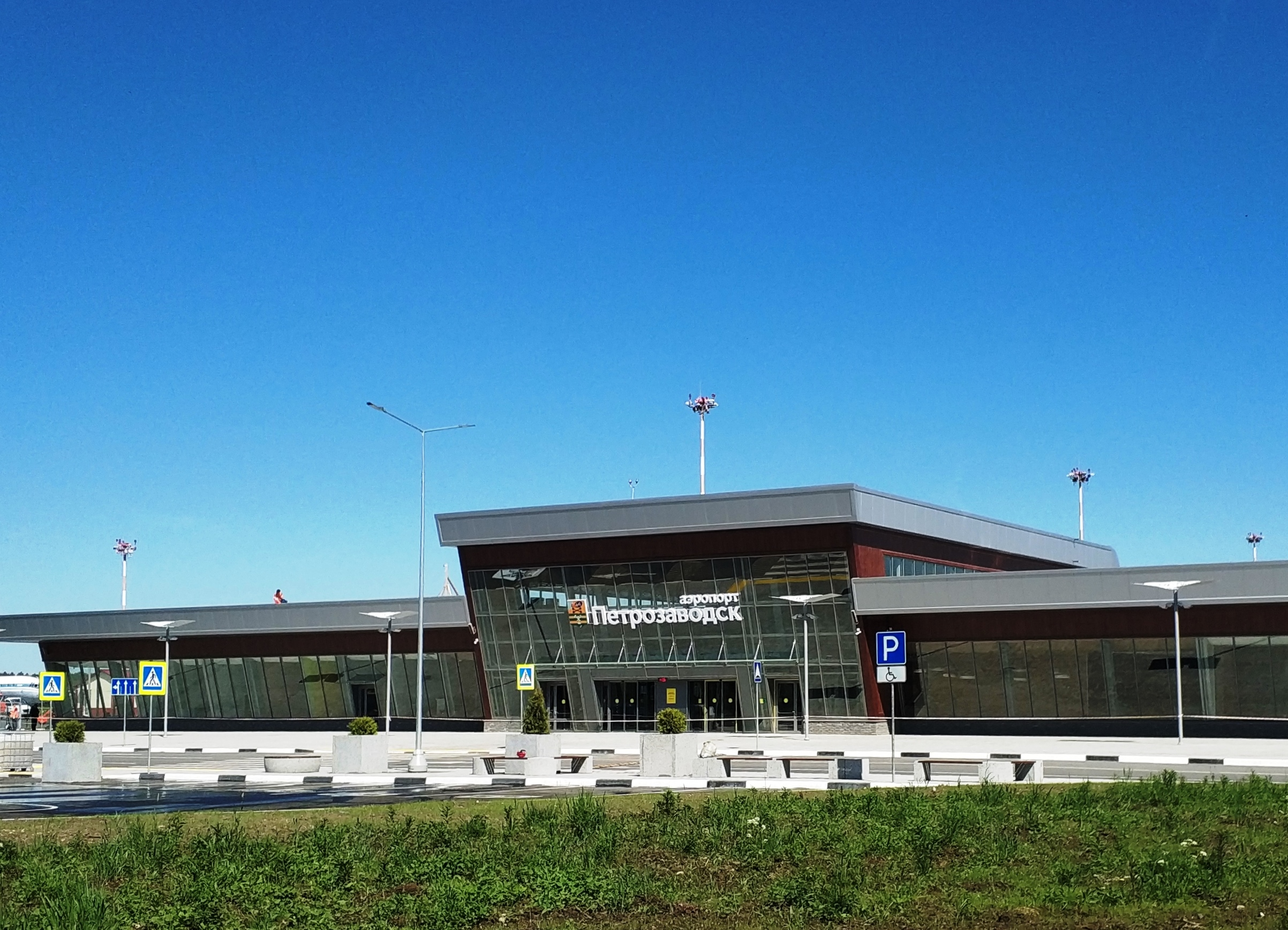
Petrozavodsk Airport

=== Automobile ===
The distance to Moscow is 1010 km, St. Petersburg - 412 km, the distance to Finland along the route of the international highway «Blue Highway» does not exceed 350 km. The federal highway E105 R 21 «Kola» (St. Petersburg — Murmansk — Norway) passes through the city. In addition, Petrozavodsk is the beginning of a number of roads of regional significance: A 133 Petrozavodsk — Suoyarvi and R19 Petrozavodsk — Voznesenye — Oshtinsky Pogost.

=== Railway ===
Petrozavodsk station is a major junction of railway lines (to Saint Petersburg, Murmansk, Sortavala, Kostomuksha).

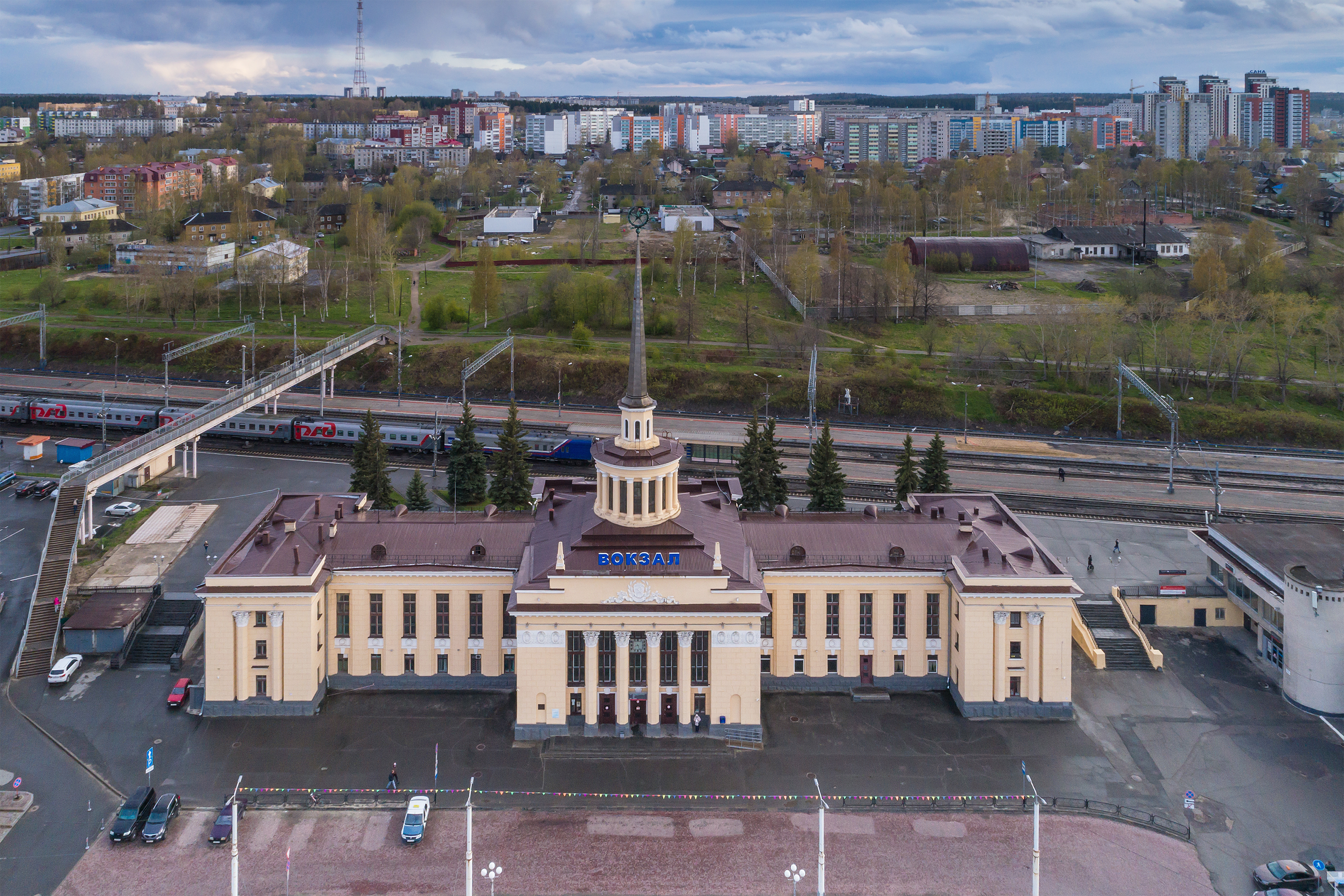
Petrozavodsk Railway Station

Railway transportation is carried out by the Oktyabrskaya Railway (a branch of JSC Russian Railways). As part of the investment program of JSC «RZD» in 2005, a section of the Idel — Petrozavodsk — Svir railway was electrified. Branded train of the Oktyabrskaya Railway № 17/18 «Karelia» (Petrozavodsk—Moscow). Other trains of local formation are «Kalevala» (Petrozavodsk — St. Petersburg) and «Petrozavodsk - Kostomuksha». On December 28, 2012, the trial movement of the Petrozavodsk — Joensuu train began.

Suburban rail transportation is carried out by the «North-Western Suburban Passenger Company».

=== Trolleybus ===
The start date of regular trolleybus traffic is September 5, 1961. As of November 2009, 110 trolleybuses were in operation in the city (5 more are under conservation).

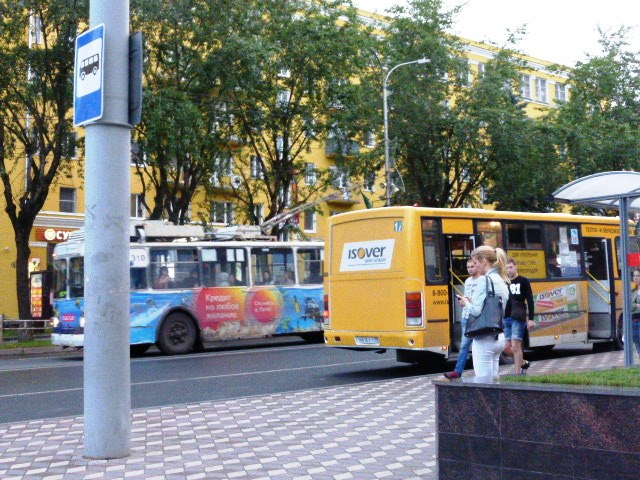
Urban public transport

Petrozavodsk trolleybus system has 5 operating routes as of June 2022. The length of the trolleybus contact network in single-track terms is 95.5 kilometers. The fare is 38 rubles (from January 1, 2023). In 2022, the purchase of new trolleybuses began.

=== Autobus ===
The first car in Petrozavodsk arrived in 1911. A few years later, on May 9, 1915, a shared taxi was opened in Petrozavodsk, with a 5 seater car owned by A.V. Timofeeva shuttling people from Petrozavodsk to Sulazhgora. In April of 1918, Ivan Artemievich Maminov launched the first "bus" in Petrozavodsk, which shuttled people from the railway station to the city centre, breaking the monopoly that cab drivers had previously held. The state bus fleet in Petrozavodsk appeared in 1921, which would later become Convoy No. 1126. As of 2025, the bus system links the neighborhoods of Sulazhgora, Drevlyanka, and Kukkovka to the city center.

== Geography ==
=== Climate ===
Under the Köppen climate classification, Petrozavodsk experiences a humid continental climate (Dfb) bordering on a subarctic climate (Dfc) and unlike other localities in Russia on its latitude, temperatures are relatively mild for the latitude. This is due to the influence of the milder oceanic and maritime air masses reaching the city from the Atlantic Ocean and the Baltic Sea, especially in winter and the moderating effect of the nearby lakes. The alternation of milder and colder air masses causes rapid changes in temperatures, especially during the cool half of the year. Winters, though long and cold, are mild for the high latitude, while summers are short and warm. The city experiences an average of 161 frost days per year, which is still less than places further east at the same latitude. The lake influence is stronger in summer, where Petrozavodsk has quite low diurnal temperature variation with mild nights for its latitude. Summer is moderately warm, autumn starts with clear but usually cool weather in the first half of September. Precipitation averages 611 millimetres or 24.06 inches annually.

Climate data for Petrozavodsk (1991–2020, extremes 1816–present)
Month	Jan	Feb	Mar	Apr	May	Jun	Jul	Aug	Sep	Oct	Nov	Dec	Year
Record high °C (°F)	5.5 (41.9)	7.3 (45.1)	15.5 (59.9)	24.2 (75.6)	33.0 (91.4)	34.3 (93.7)	33.9 (93.0)	32.4 (90.3)	28.5 (83.3)	21.3 (70.3)	11.1 (52.0)	9.4 (48.9)	33.9 (93.0)
Mean daily maximum °C (°F)	−5.7 (21.7)	−5.2 (22.6)	0.0 (32.0)	6.7 (44.1)	13.8 (56.8)	18.8 (65.8)	21.5 (70.7)	19.3 (66.7)	13.6 (56.5)	6.4 (43.5)	0.2 (32.4)	−3.3 (26.1)	7.2 (45.0)
Daily mean °C (°F)	−8.4 (16.9)	−8.2 (17.2)	−3.5 (25.7)	2.5 (36.5)	8.9 (48.0)	14.1 (57.4)	17.1 (62.8)	15.0 (59.0)	10.0 (50.0)	3.8 (38.8)	−1.9 (28.6)	−5.6 (21.9)	3.7 (38.7)
Mean daily minimum °C (°F)	−11.4 (11.5)	−11.4 (11.5)	−6.9 (19.6)	−1.3 (29.7)	4.1 (39.4)	9.4 (48.9)	12.7 (54.9)	11.1 (52.0)	6.8 (44.2)	1.5 (34.7)	−4.1 (24.6)	−8.1 (17.4)	0.2 (32.4)
Record low °C (°F)	−41.6 (−42.9)	−39.3 (−38.7)	−30.0 (−22.0)	−19.3 (−2.7)	−9.8 (14.4)	−2.6 (27.3)	−0.1 (31.8)	−1.7 (28.9)	−5.0 (23.0)	−13.4 (7.9)	−27.5 (−17.5)	−36.8 (−34.2)	−41.6 (−42.9)
Average precipitation mm (inches)	38 (1.5)	29 (1.1)	31 (1.2)	32 (1.3)	48 (1.9)	61 (2.4)	82 (3.2)	81 (3.2)	59 (2.3)	56 (2.2)	51 (2.0)	44 (1.7)	612 (24.1)
Average extreme snow depth cm (inches)	16 (6.3)	21 (8.3)	22 (8.7)	5 (2.0)	0 (0)	0 (0)	0 (0)	0 (0)	0 (0)	0 (0)	5 (2.0)	11 (4.3)	22 (8.7)
Average rainy days	4	3	6	11	16	18	18	18	20	19	11	6	150
Average snowy days	26	24	20	10	4	0.3	0	0	1	8	20	27	140
Average relative humidity (%)	87	85	80	70	66	71	75	80	84	86	89	89	80
Mean monthly sunshine hours	18.2	53.5	135.5	192.4	271.5	285.1	286.9	226.2	131.8	59.7	18.1	5.2	1,684.1
Source 1: Погода и Климат
Source 2: NOAA

== Notable people ==
- Vladimir Drachev (born 1966), biathlete
- Denis Zubko (born 1974), association football player
- Sergey Katanandov (born 1955), Head of the Republic of Karelia in 2002–2010
- Anastasia Maksimova (born 1991), Rhythmic Gymnnast
- Timur Dibirov (born 1983), handball player
- Irina Sidorkova (born 2003), racing driver

== Twin towns – sister cities ==
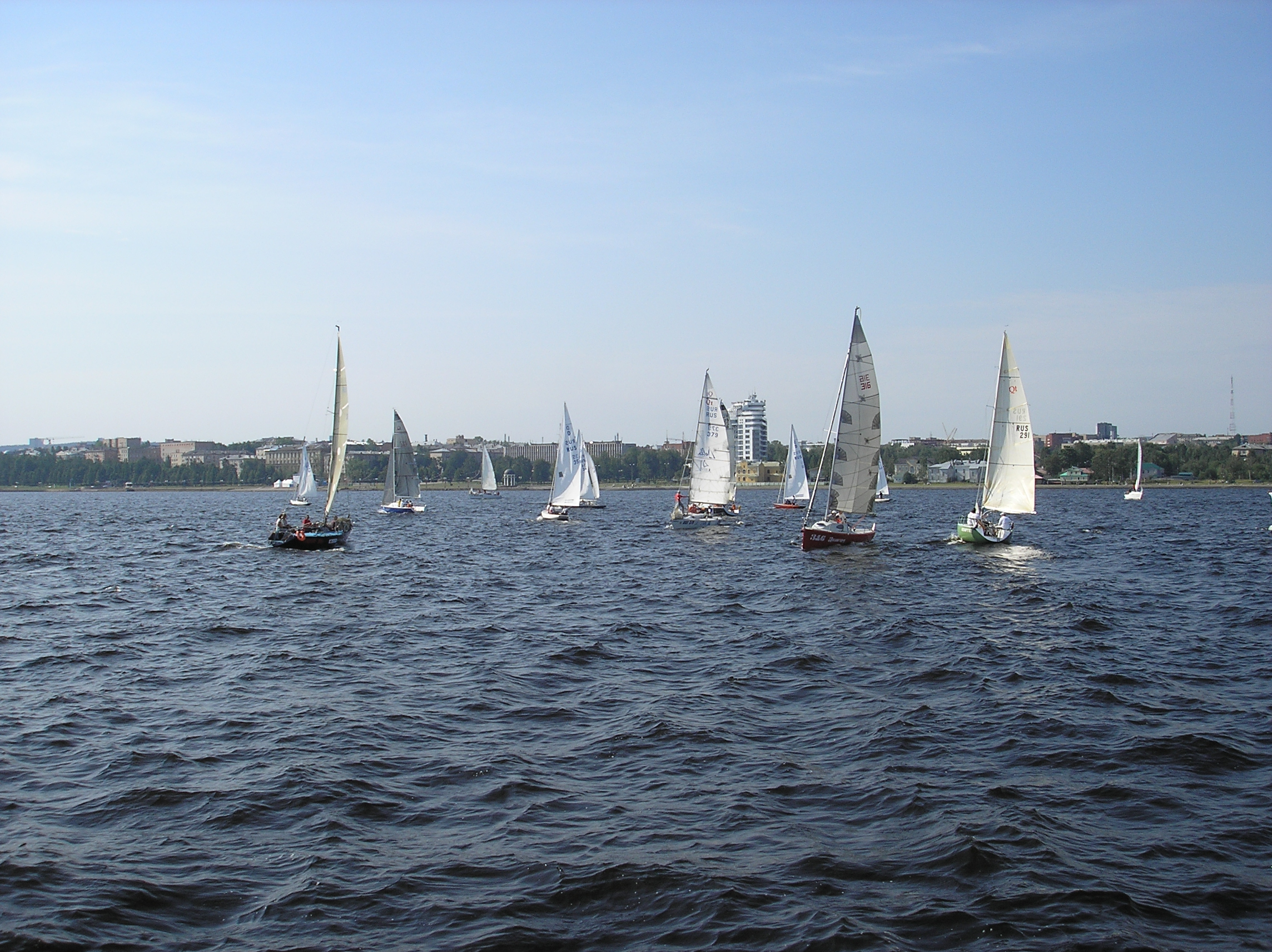
Yachting in Petrozavodsk

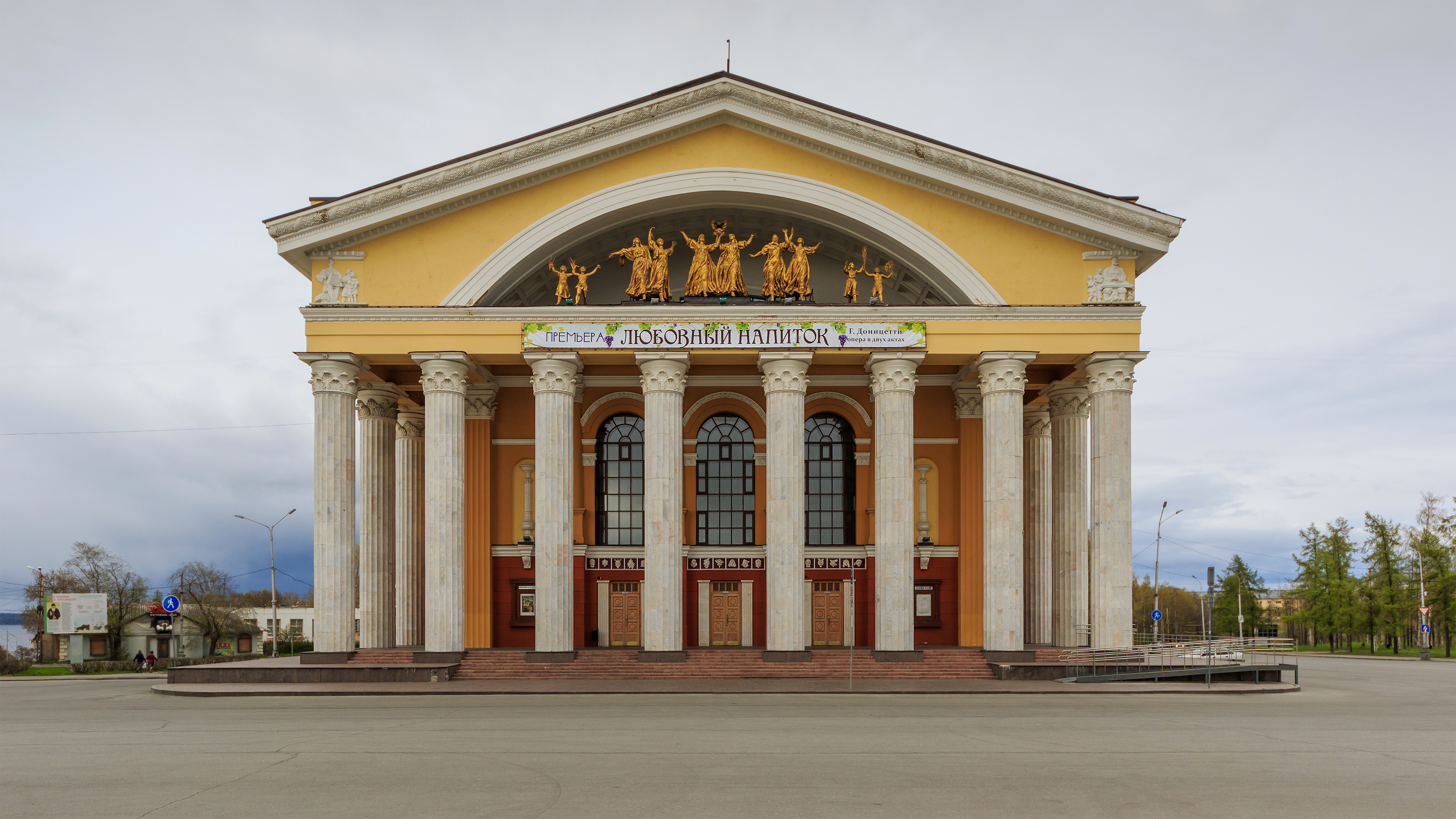
Petrozavodsk Music Theater building

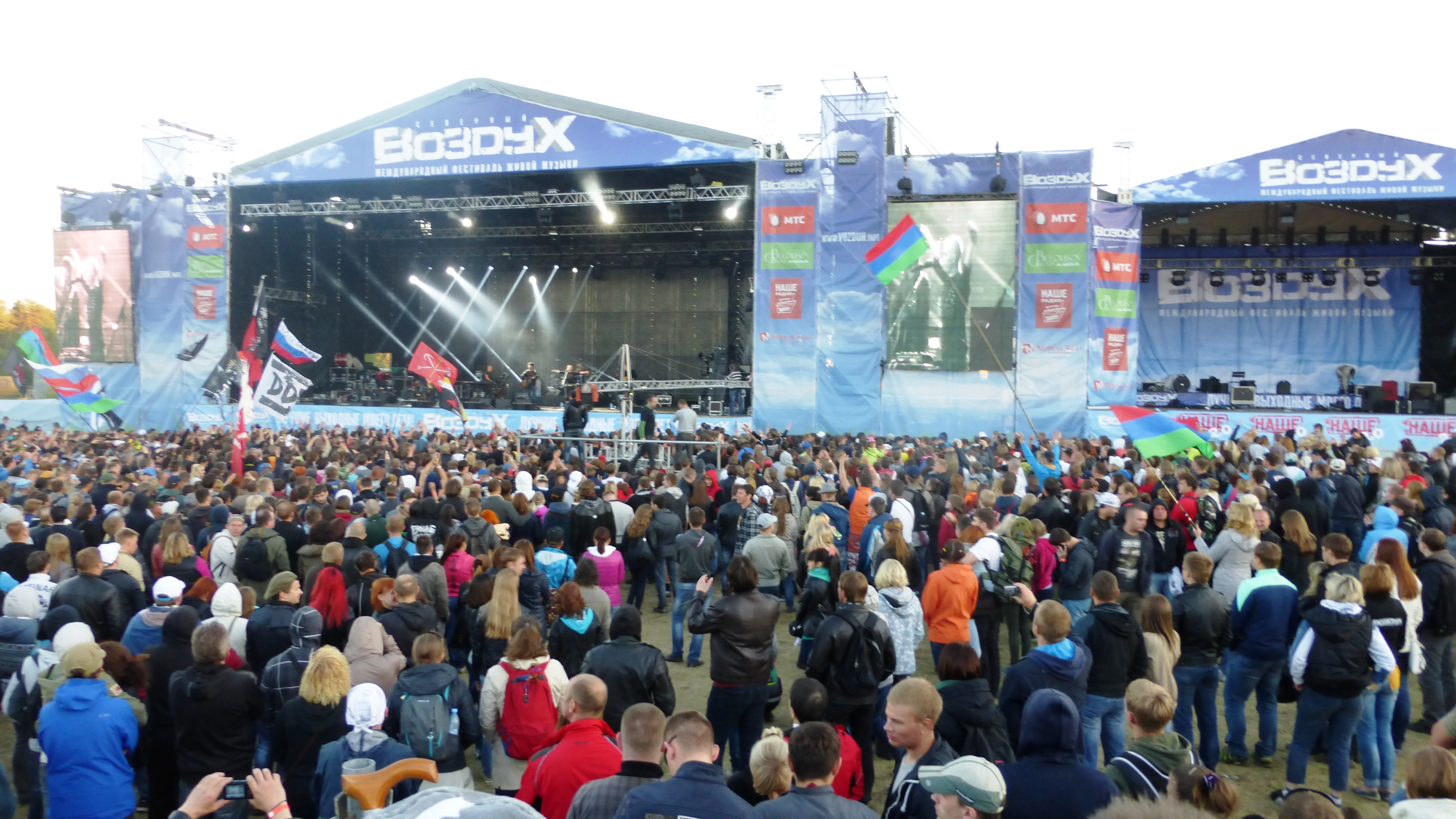
Music festival in Petrozavodsk

Petrozavodsk is twinned with:

- Alytus, Lithuania
- Brest, Belarus
- Duluth, United States
- Joensuu, Finland
- Narva, Estonia
- Neubrandenburg, Germany
- Rana, Norway
- La Rochelle, France
- Tübingen, Germany
- Umeå, Sweden
- Vagharshapat, Armenia
- Varkaus, Finland

== In popular culture ==
In the American television series The Sopranos, Tony Soprano's mistress, Irina Peltsin, is from Petrozavodsk.

The Finnish film The Unknown Soldier depicts the Finnish army capturing and looting the city.

== See also ==
- Karl Marx Avenue
- Saint Petersburg
- Sortavala
