= Karl Marx Avenue (Petrozavodsk, Karelia) =

Avenue in Petrozavodsk, Karelia, Russia

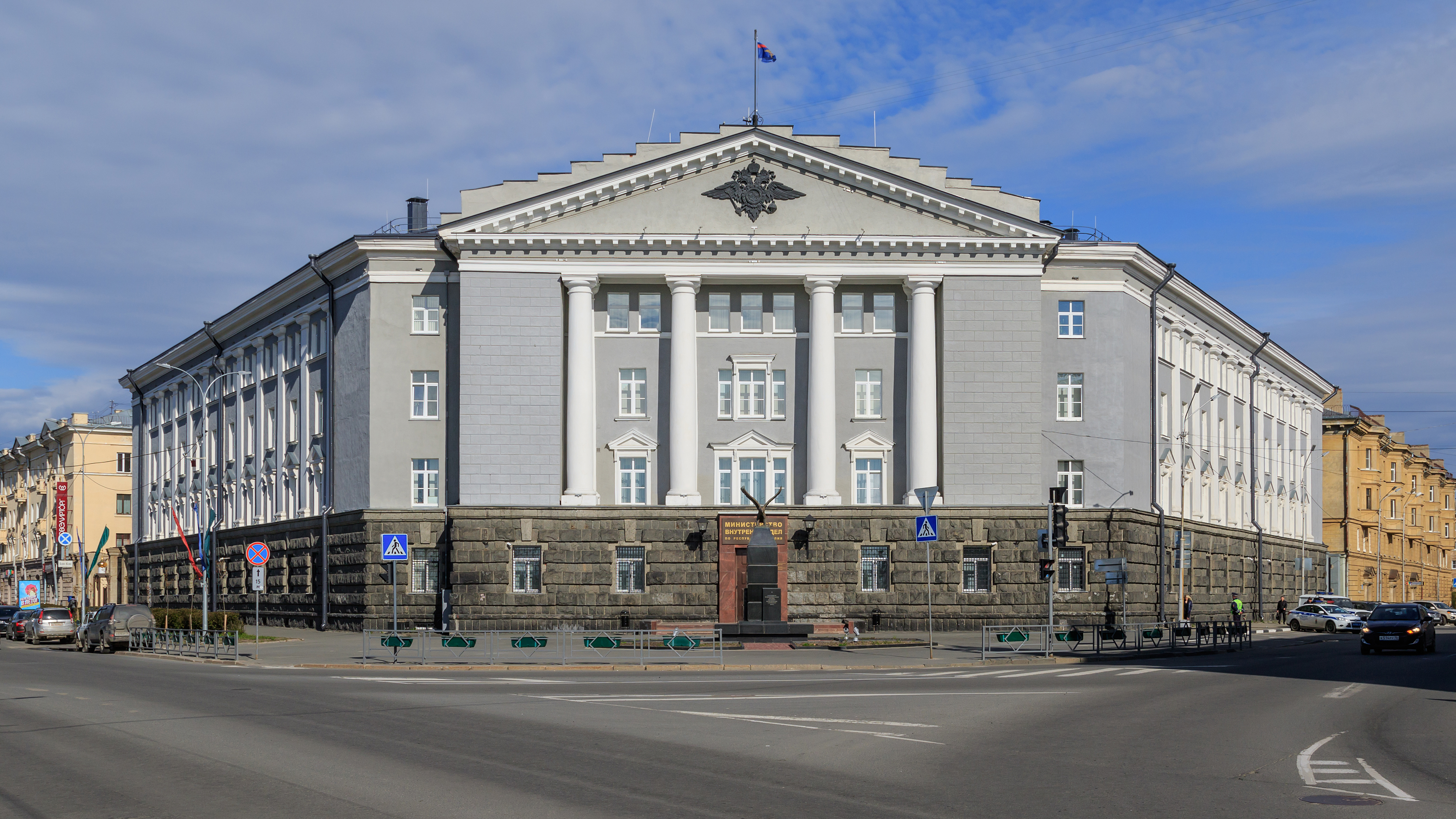
- Building of the Ministry of Internal Affairs of the Republic of Karelia, June 5, 2017.
- Interactive map of Karl Marx Avenue
- Former name(s): Olonets Tract, Line to Petrovsky Factory, Line to Old Factory, Upland Line, Olonets Road, Great Street, Nagorskaya Slobodskaya Line, Nalichnaya Street, Preshpekt Street, Great Olonets Road, Saint Petersburg Street, Petersburg Street, English Street, Vladimir Street, Mariinsky Street, Marshal Street, Mannerheim Street, Main Street, Karl Marx Avenue
- Type: Avenue
- Postal code: 185035

Karl Marx Avenue (Karelian: Karl Marksan prospektu, Russian: Проспе́кт Ка́рла Ма́ркса) is an avenue in the center of the city of Petrozavodsk, the capital of the Republic of Karelia. It runs from Great Petropavlovskaya Street to Lenin Square. House numbering starts from Lake Onega. It is one of the oldest streets in the city. Along the avenue are Yamka Park, Mariinsky Boulevard, the Puppet Theater Square, and the Alley of the City of Military Glory, making it one of the greenest streets in the city.

The avenue's development is included in the list of architectural monuments and is under state protection as an example of ensemble architecture since the 1950s. Additionally, the building of the Museum of Fine Arts of the Republic of Karelia, monuments to Karl Marx and Friedrich Engels, and Peter I are monuments of federal significance.

On July 7, 2025, a section of Karl Marx Avenue (from Petrovskaya Embankment to Kirov Square) was separated and restored to its historical name, which holds cultural and historical significance—Great Petropavlovskaya Street.

== Naming ==
The street has had numerous names. In the 18th, 19th, and early 20th centuries, it was known by: Line for the Residence of Staff and Senior Officers, Line to Petrovsky Factory, Line to Old Factory, Upland Line (due to its location on a hill), Olonets Road, Great Street, Nagorskaya Slobodskaya Line, Nalichnaya Street, Preshpekt, Olonets Road, Olonets Tract, Saint Petersburg Street (named after the city of Saint Petersburg, in the direction of which the street ran), Petersburg Street, English Street (due to the houses built for Scottish ["English"] specialists ["artists"] who arrived in 1786 led by Charles Gascoigne at the Alexander Factory), Vladimir Street (for Grand Duke Vladimir Alexandrovich, who visited Petrozavodsk), and Mariinsky Street (for Grand Duchess Maria Pavlovna, who visited Petrozavodsk).

On June 12, 1918, the General Assembly of the Petrozavodsk City Council of Workers' and Red Army Deputies merged Mariinsky Street with Sobornaya (now Great Petropavlovskaya) Street (which ran from Lake Onega) into Karl Marx Avenue, for the German thinker and public figure, the founder of Marxism.

On November 3, 1941, the head of the Petrozavodsk District (a representative of the occupation authorities) named it Marshal Street, for Finnish Marshal Carl Gustaf Mannerheim. On December 1, 1942, the occupation intelligence department assigned the name Mannerheim Street; on the 31st of the same month, the occupation authorities named it Main Street (in Finnish, Valtakatu), reflecting its status in the city.

On June 28, 1944, after the liberation of Petrozavodsk, the Soviet name Karl Marx Avenue was restored.

On July 7, 2025, a separate street was again allocated from the avenue on the section from Petrovskaya Embankment to Kirov Square (as it was before 1918), and its historical name Great Petropavlovskaya Street was restored. Since then, Karl Marx Avenue has run from Great Petropavlovskaya Street to Lenin Square.

== History ==
=== 18th century ===
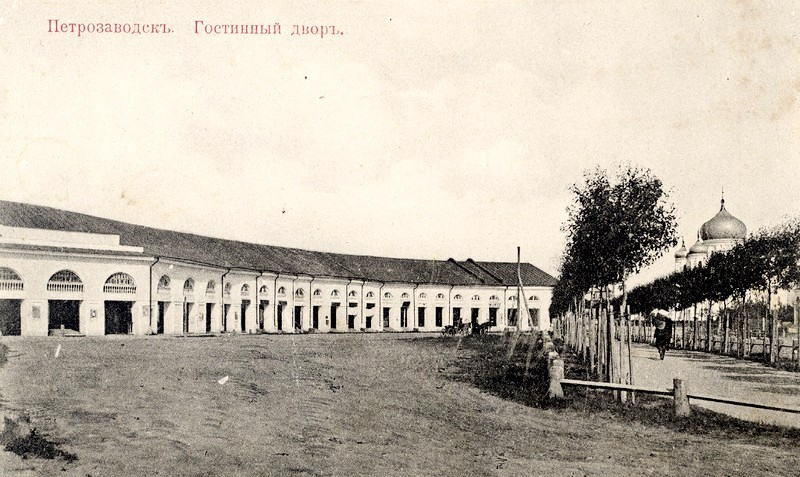
Gostiny Dvor at the beginning of the 20th century

In the 1760s, by order of the commander of the Alexander Factory Anikita Sergeyevich Yartsov, construction of residential houses for factory management and specialists began on the banks of the Lososinka River. Eight houses, each 12 sazhens long, were built on stone foundations.

With the change in the city's status, becoming a provincial city in 1784, these houses began to accommodate civil servants. The street was home to Gavriil Romanovich Derzhavin, the governor of the Olonets Governorate and a renowned Russian poet.

In 1786, Catherine II decided to move Scottish ("English") specialists led by Charles Gascoigne to Petrozavodsk. The provincial administration moved to Round Square, and the street was transferred to the specialists, which later led to it being called English Street.

In 1787, the reconstruction of these wooden buildings began, completed in 1793, with some houses rebuilt in brick and plastered.

In 1790, a Gostiny Dvor was built on the street according to the design of architect Fyodor Kramer, becoming the center of trade in Petrozavodsk for a long time. It occupied a large block up to Sennaya Square.

In 1793, the merchant Stakhey Zhdanov began building the first private house next to the Gostiny Dvor.

=== 19th century ===
After Gascoigne and many Scottish specialists left by 1810, some premises on English Street were repurposed for administrative needs. In the 1830s and 1840s, in addition to housing for factory officials, English Street hosted a military court, a factory hospital, the accounting department of the factory administration, and a post office. In 1843, the merchant Zhdanov's house was converted into the Mining Administration of the Alexander Factory. In 1863, the Mining Administration building was sold to the city and housed the city administration, police, fire chief, and city bailiff. In 1858, a stone guardhouse was constructed opposite the Gostiny Dvor, and in 1895, it housed the Alekseevskaya Public Library. In 1885, the street was renamed Mariinsky in honor of Grand Duchess Maria Pavlovna. In 1895, a fire watchtower was built at the city administration building.

Photographs of Mariinskaya Street from the late 19th and early 20th centuries

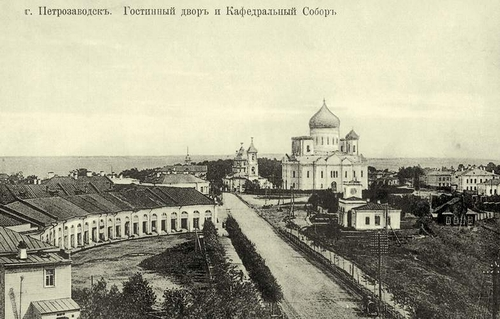
View from the fire tower of Gostiny Dvor and the Cathedral of the Holy Spirit

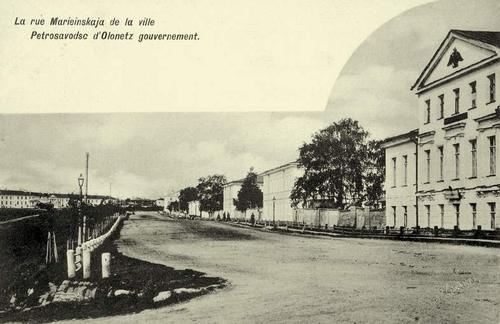
Postcard in French depicting Mariinskaya Street. In the foreground is the city administration building.

=== 20th century ===
In 1900, Mariinsky Street was paved.

In 1905, a boulevard was established along Mariinsky Street.

In 1911, the former guardhouse building opened as the "Saturn" cinema. Over time, it housed a telephone exchange, Alekseevskaya Library, and a puppet theater. In the 1960s, it was significantly rebuilt, and in 2006, a new puppet theater building was constructed on the same site.

In 1912, a Public Assembly building with a 550-seat auditorium was built. Later, it housed the "Triumph" cinema, then the Russian Drama Theater, and the Finnish Drama (now National) Theater. The building was significantly rebuilt in 1965 and 2003.

The avenue was heavily damaged during the war: the Gostiny Dvor building was completely destroyed, and many buildings were reduced to their facades. In the late 1940s and early 1950s, reconstruction of the avenue began. Conducted in two stages, this widened the section from Kirov Square to Lenin Square by nine meters. New buildings were constructed behind the existing ones, which were later demolished. During the expansion, a second row of greenery was created along the houses, which, together with the existing boulevard on the undeveloped side, transformed the avenue into a large boulevard.

== Sights ==
=== Kirov Square ===
Kirov Square is at the intersection of Karl Marx Avenue, Kuibyshev Street, Lunacharsky Street, and Pushkin Street. Before the Revolution, it was called Sobornaya. During the early Soviet times, it was Freedom Square, then Republic Square. In 1936, it was renamed after Kirov.

The first buildings on the modern square's site were two wooden churches: Petropavlovskaya with a high spire and Holy Spirit (later Resurrection) church, built in the early 18th century. In 1777, the Petrozavodsk settlement received city status, and the city administration began implementing the first urban development plan. The "square" around the churches became almost square, and plans were made to build a stone cathedral. In 1790, a public school building was constructed, which later became the Male Gymnasium (now the Museum of Fine Arts of the Republic of Karelia). In 1840, the merchant Syrovotkin's house was built, later acquired by the male gymnasium to house the director. Nearby, in 1858, a boarding school building was constructed, which later housed the Female Gymnasium (now the building of the Kantele ensemble).

Then began the construction of the other side of the square. In the late 19th century, buildings for the Petrozavodsk Craft School and the District Public School were constructed. From 1859 to 1872, the largest church in the city, the Holy Spirit Cathedral, was built on the square, and in 1881, a monument to Alexander II was erected. After the revolution, the emperor's monument was demolished; and in 1924, the Resurrection and Petropavlovsky cathedrals burned down. In 1936, the Holy Spirit Cathedral was demolished. In the same year, a monument to Kirov was erected in its place.

In 1955, the Musical Theater building was constructed according to the design of architect Savva Brodsky, who in 1965 reconstructed the Finnish Theater building.

There are plans for further reconstruction of the square.

Houses nos. 6, 8, 10, and 19, on Kirov Square, are included in the address list of Karl Marx Avenue.

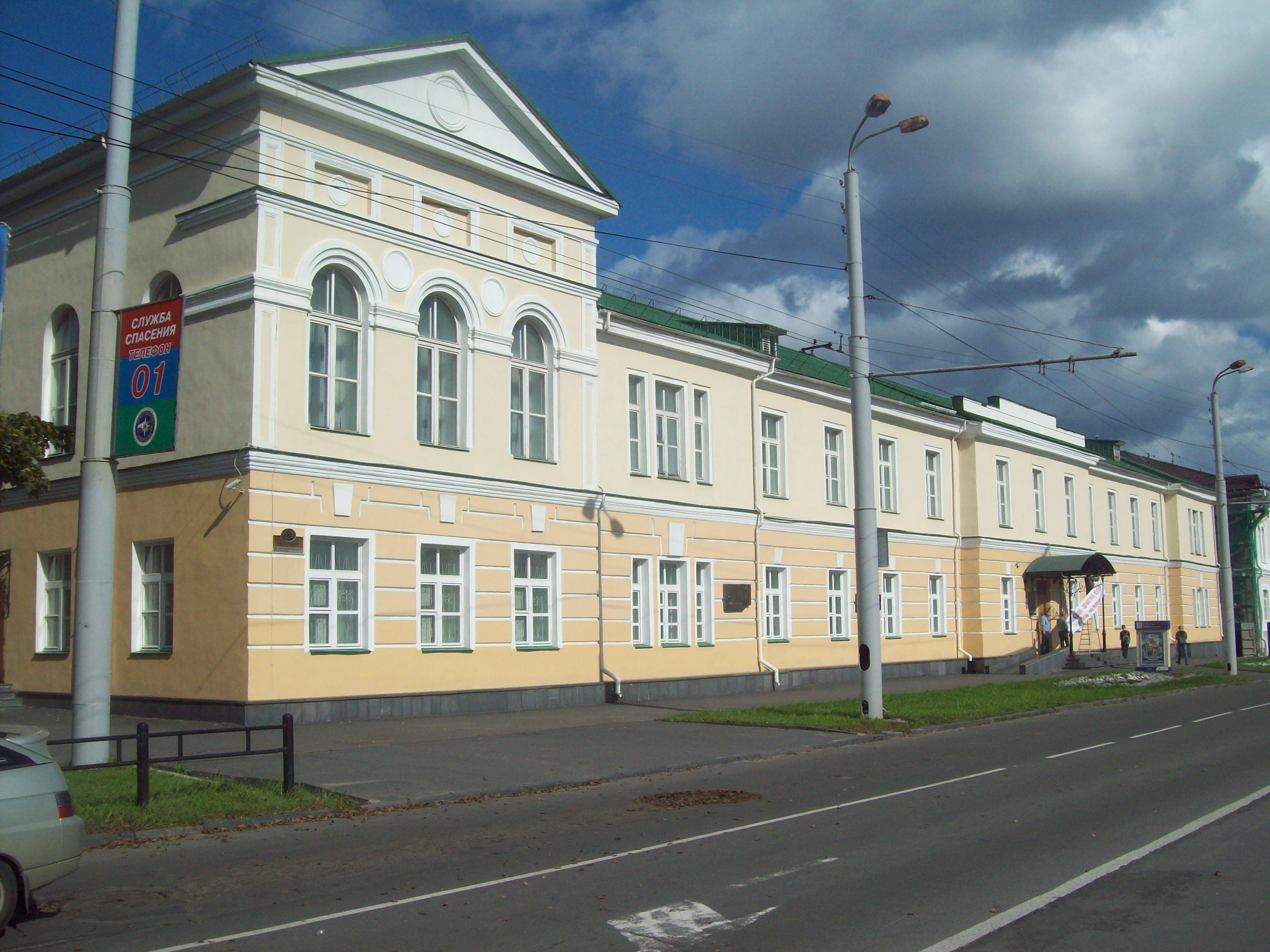
Museum of Fine Arts of the Republic of Karelia

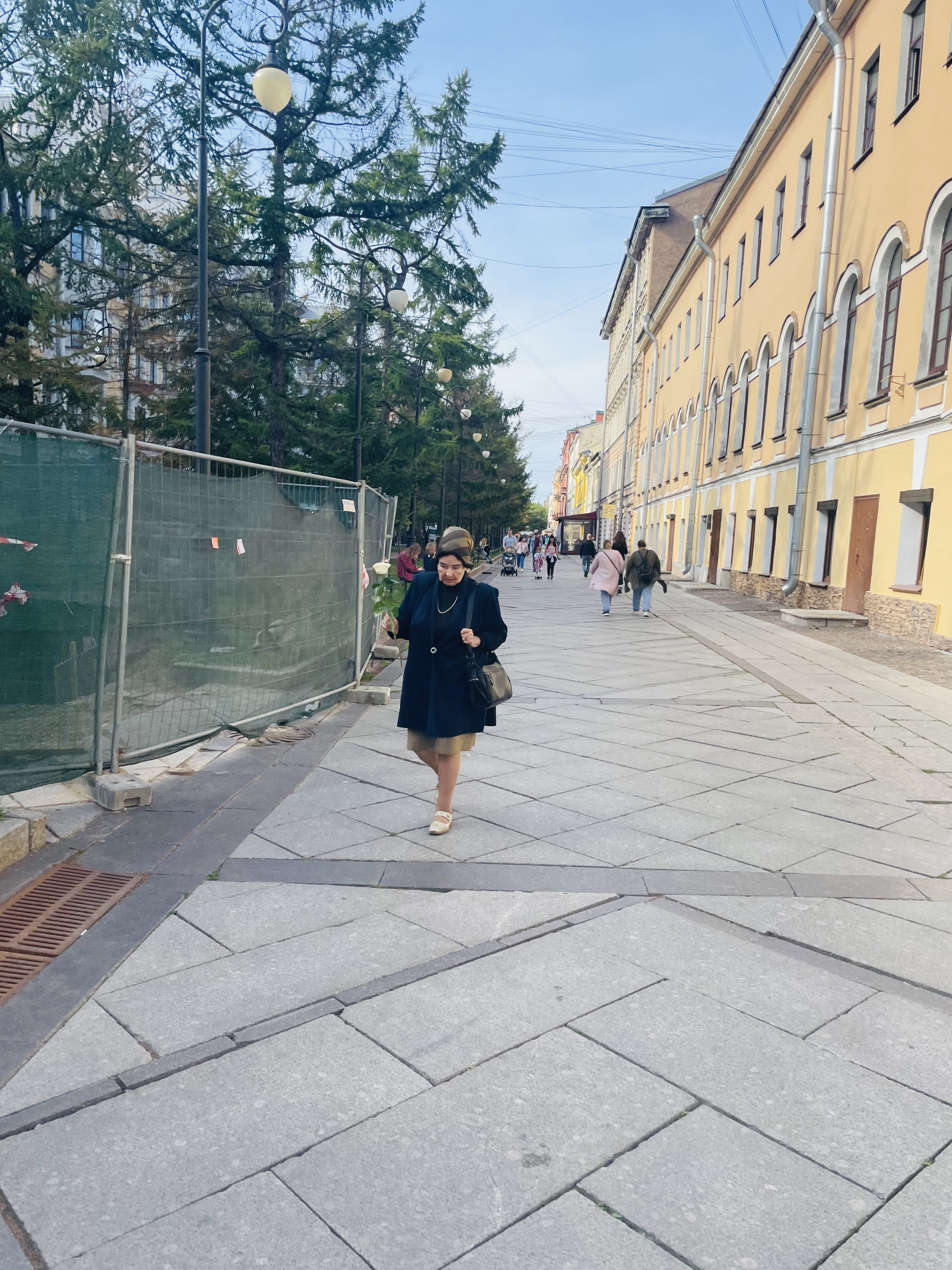
Kantele House

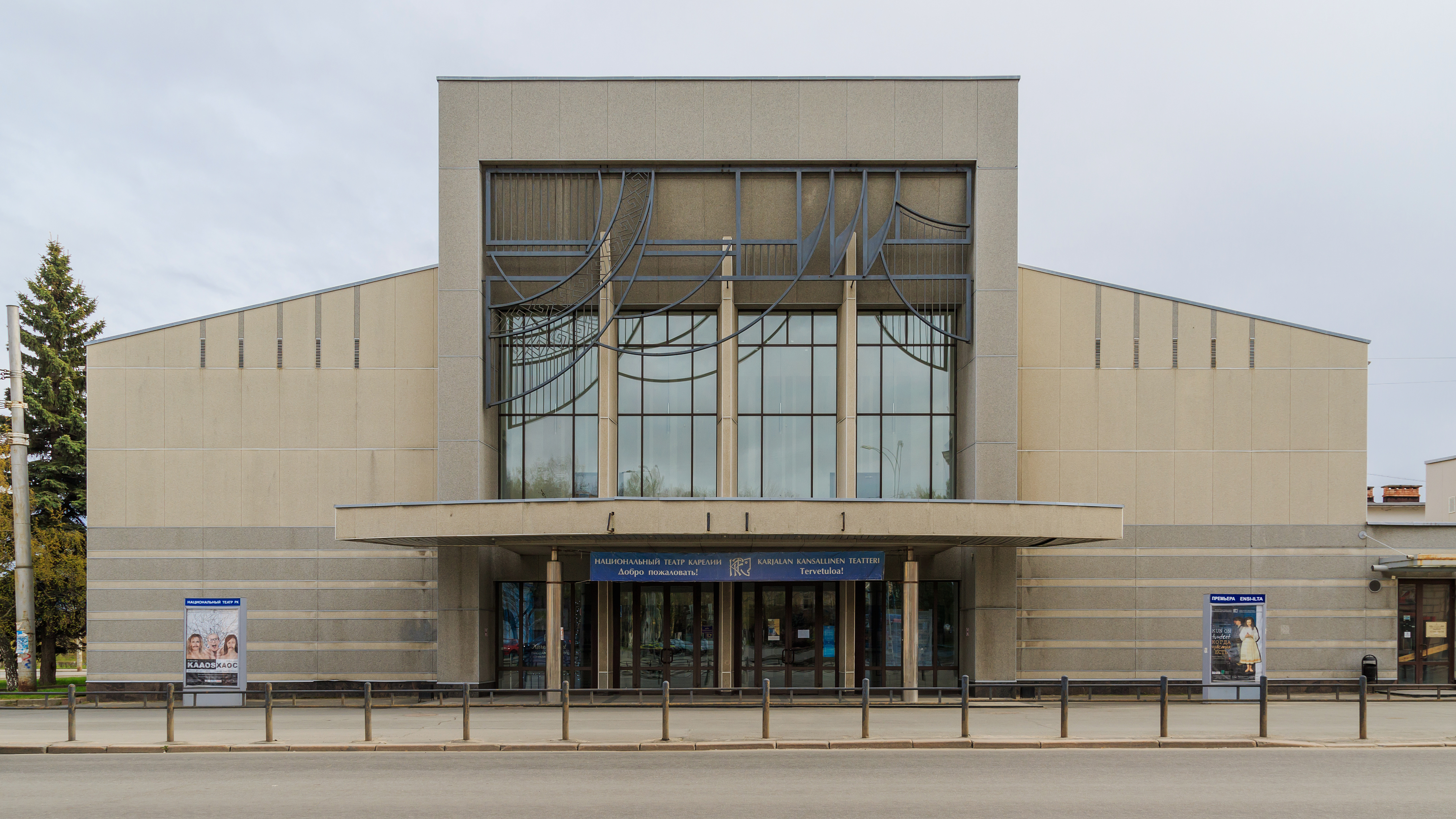
National Theatre of the Republic of Karelia

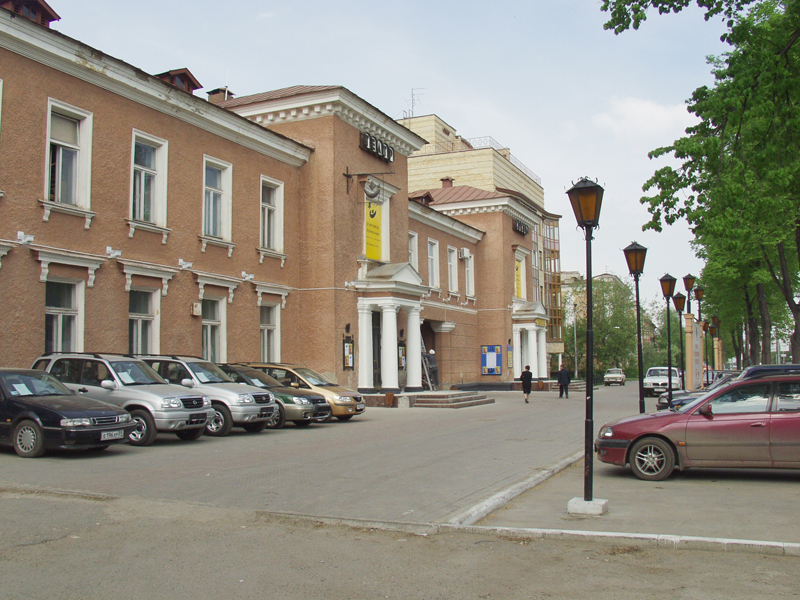
Karelian Puppet Theatre

==== Kantele House, no. 6 ====
The Female Gymnasium building was constructed in 1858 by a provincial architect, Tukhtarov. Initially, the building housed a boarding school, admitting children from poor noble and official families to train future clerks. In 1861, the boarding school was converted into the Mariinsky Female School, with its decoration funded by Governor Arsenyev. Ten years later, the school was transformed into a female gymnasium. In 1872, the building was reconstructed according to a design by V.G. Mikhailovsky. In Soviet times, the building housed educational institutions and a dormitory of the Pedagogical Institute.

In 1987, the former gymnasium building became home to the Kantele ensemble. In celebration of the 90th anniversary of the Republic of Karelia in 2010, the building was completely renovated. Its area increased by 2.5 times, with the addition of a 100-seat auditorium, rehearsal rooms, workshops, and a recording studio.

==== Museum of Fine Arts, no. 8 ====
Construction of a stone public school building began in 1788, and it was opened on April 21, 1790. At that time, it was the largest building in the city. After the abolition of the Olonets Governorate in 1796, the school was moved, and the building housed city administrative offices. In 1802, the former school building was damaged by fire; it was restored in 1810 and housed a male gymnasium. After the October Revolution, it served as a barracks, then hosted various institutions, and now is the Museum of Fine Arts of the Republic of Karelia.

==== Gymnasium Directorate Building, no. 10 ====
The building was constructed in 1840 by a Petrozavodsk merchant of the 2nd Guild, G.M. Syrovotkin, on a plot purchased from the male gymnasium. After the merchant's death, the house was acquired by the male gymnasium between 1875 and 1877. The upper floor housed the gymnasium director's apartment, while the lower floor had apartments for two assistant class tutors. In 1918, the city's first music school was opened in the building. In Soviet times, it was used for administrative purposes. Currently, it houses the State Committee for Life Support, Prevention, and Elimination of Emergencies.

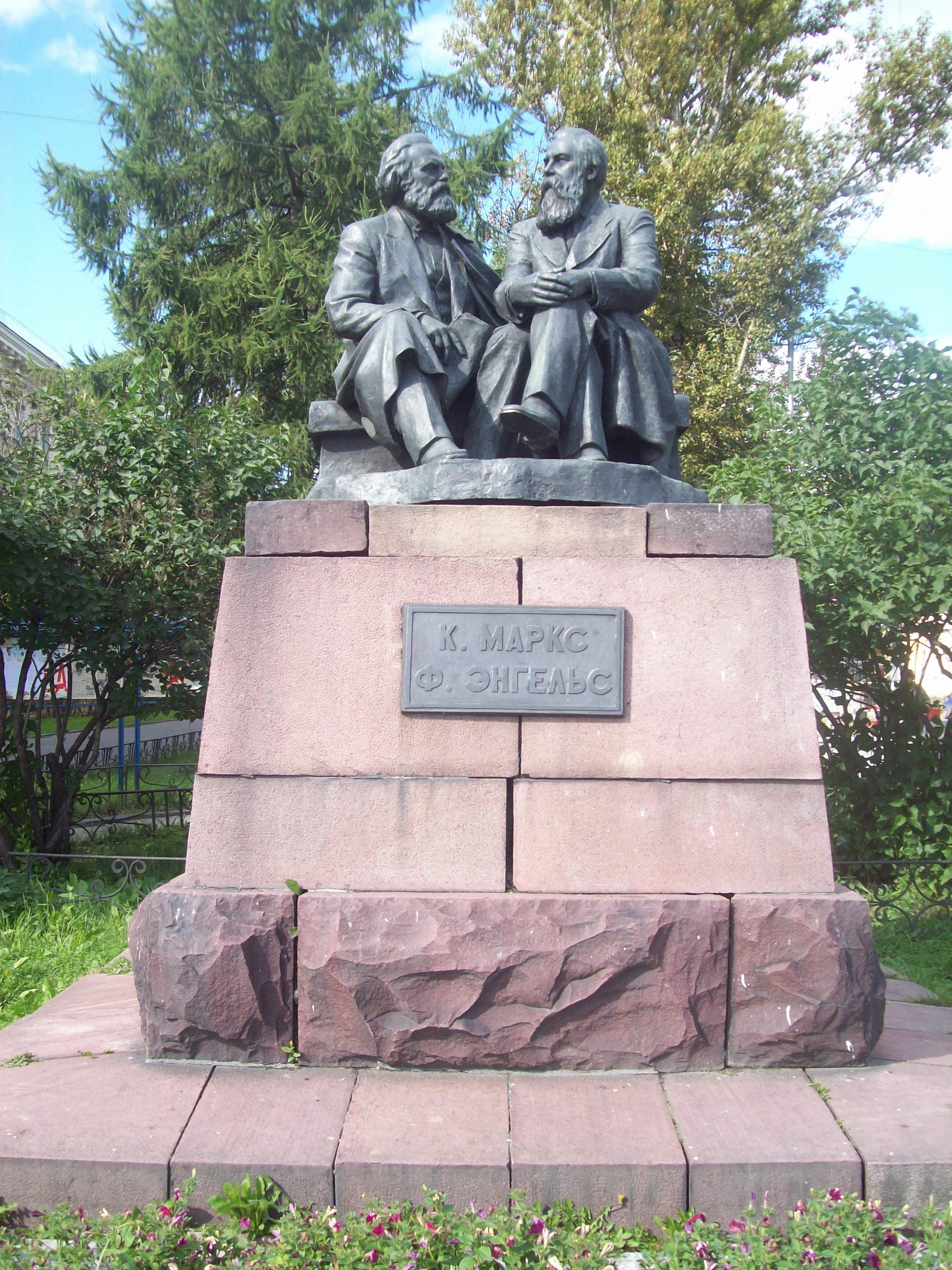
Monument to Karl Marx and Friedrich Engels

=== From Kirov Square to Kirov Street ===
==== Monument to Karl Marx and Friedrich Engels ====
On May 10, 1960, a monument to Karl Marx and Friedrich Engels, depicted in conversation, was erected at the intersection of the avenue with Kuibyshev Street, near house no. 14. Its sculptors were the Ukrainians Efim Isaevich Belostotsky, Elius Moiseevich Fridman, and Pyotr Filippovich Ostapenko. The sculptural group was cast in bronze at the Mytishchi Art Casting Factory, and the pedestal was carved from Shoksha crimson quartzite.

==== Residential buildings nos. 12 and 14 ====
Residential buildings nos. 12 and 14, designed by the architect Lazar Yudelevich Tarler in the Neo-Renaissance style, were built from 1953 to 1956. The southern facade of no. 12 faces Karl Marx Avenue and the northern faces Kuibyshev Street. The main facade of the building, with octagonal turrets, faces Kirov Square. The two houses are connected by an arch.

The houses are four-story, built of brick. The ground floors are rusticated and house shops and cafes. The upper, residential floors are bounded by richly decorated cornices and adorned with a rhythmic series of decorative compositions.

==== Karelia-Market Trading House, no. 16 ====
In the 1930s, the Anokhin Printing House and an assignation bank were built here. After the war, it was one of the few surviving buildings. However, in 1957, it almost completely burned down, and in 1967, a three-story department store "Karelia" was built in its place according to the design of L. Rotinov and V. Arkhipov, fitting well into the 1950s architecture. At that time, it was the largest department store in the city (with a sales area of 2940 m²). In 2001–2002, the building was leased long-term. During those years, it was reconstructed, increasing the sales area to 3963 m² by using storage spaces on the third floor. Another reconstruction took place from 2006 to 2007.

==== National Theater and Puppet Theater Building, no. 19 ====
The history of the National Theater and Puppet Theater building, despite its modern appearance, spans over 150 years. In 1858, a stone guardhouse was built opposite the Gostiny Dvor. In 1872, the burgher Korytov purchased a flag with the coat of arms of the Olonets Governorate. In 1895, the Alekseevskaya Public Library was housed in this building. Nearby, in 1912, a Public Assembly building with a 550-seat auditorium was constructed. Later, it housed the "Triumph" cinema, and in Soviet times, the State Drama Theater. The architect Savva Brodsky, in 1965, rebuilt both adjacent buildings into a single theater complex. The left wing housed the Finnish Drama Theater, and the right wing the Puppet Theater. From 1995 to 2006, a major reconstruction of the building took place, equipping both theaters with modern facilities, increasing the premises' area, and completely transforming the Puppet Theater wing. In 2006, four sculptures were installed on the facade of the Puppet Theater: Navigator, Buffoon, Fairy, and Traveler.

=== From Kirov Street to Dzerzhinsky Street ===
==== Ministry of Internal Affairs of the Republic of Karelia, no. 18 ====
The building was constructed from 1949 to 1951 according to the design of architect M.F. Vyacheslavina. Until 1981, it housed the Executive Committee of the Petrozavodsk City Council of People's Deputies, and from 1982, the Ministry of Internal Affairs of the Karelian ASSR.

The building was constructed in the Neoclassicism style. It is built of brick and plastered. The ground floor is clad in granite. The main facade's loggia has a portico. A small square in front of the main facade faces Kirov Square.

==== Monument to Internal Affairs Officers who died in the line of duty ====
Opened in 2008 in front of house no. 18, the monument's unveiling was timed for the 85th anniversary of the establishment of the Ministry of Internal Affairs of the Republic of Karelia. The initiative for the monument came from the Council of Veterans of Internal Affairs and Internal Troops of the Republic. The monument's author is the sculptor and Honored Artist of the Republic of Karelia Chenka Shukvani. On a black granite pedestal, he depicted an eagle figure. The monument was created with donations from ministry employees and veterans, with support from the Head of the Republic Sergei Katanandov and directors of major enterprises.

==== Residential building no. 20 ====
The building was constructed from 1950 to 1953 according to the design of the architect M.F. Vyacheslavina in the Neorenaissance style. It is built of brick and finished with decorative plaster. In the 1950s, the building's end was connected by an arch to a house on Dzerzhinsky Street. The ground floor houses shops, while the second, third, and fourth floors contain apartments. The ground floor is rusticated, and the upper floors are decorated with a rhythmic series of decorative compositions.

=== From Dzerzhinsky Street to Lenin Square ===
==== Residential building no. 22 ====
The building was constructed at the intersection of the avenue with Dzerzhinsky Street from 1950 to 1952 according to the design of the architect Marina Georgievna Starchenko in the Neorenaissance style. The building forms an asymmetrical composition of four four-story volumes with hipped roofs: two wings of different lengths and a central part with a concave wall facing the corner between the avenue and the street. The facade of the central part has a symmetrical composition with the main entrance, a fourth-floor balcony, an octagonal attic window, and a figured pediment on the axis. The ground floor houses shops, with a cafe in the central part, and the second, third, and fourth floors contain residential apartments.

==== Karellesprom Building, no. 24 ====
The building was constructed from 1954 to 1956 in the Neoclassicism style according to the design of the architects A.I. Vlasov and E.O. Evartau. It occupies a corner position in the avenue's planning structure, with the eastern wing's facade facing the avenue and the western wing's facade facing Andropov Street. Built of brick, the building is distinguished by a developed architectural order and abundant molded details.

Initially, the building housed the Sovnarkhoz of the KASSR. From 1965, it was occupied by the forestry industry association "Karellesprom". As of 2025, it houses the Ministry of Natural Resources and Ecology and the Ministry of Economic Development of the Republic of Karelia.

In the 1960s, an additional volume was added to the eastern wing. Its architect was Emilia Andrianovna Tentyukova.

Previously it was the house of the first governor of the Olonets Governorate, Gavriil Romanovich Derzhavin, as indicated by a memorial plaque.

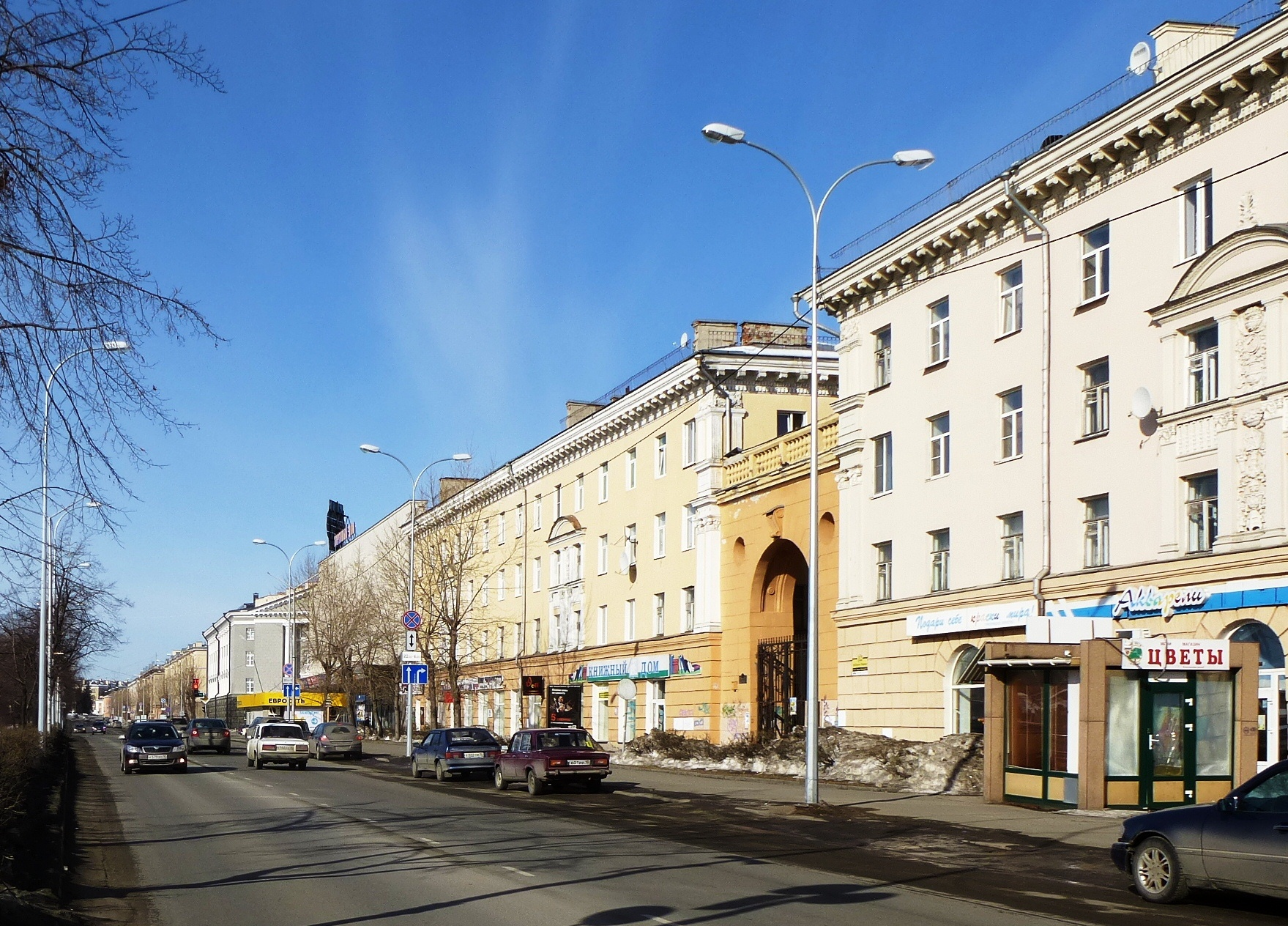
Residential buildings nos. 14, 16

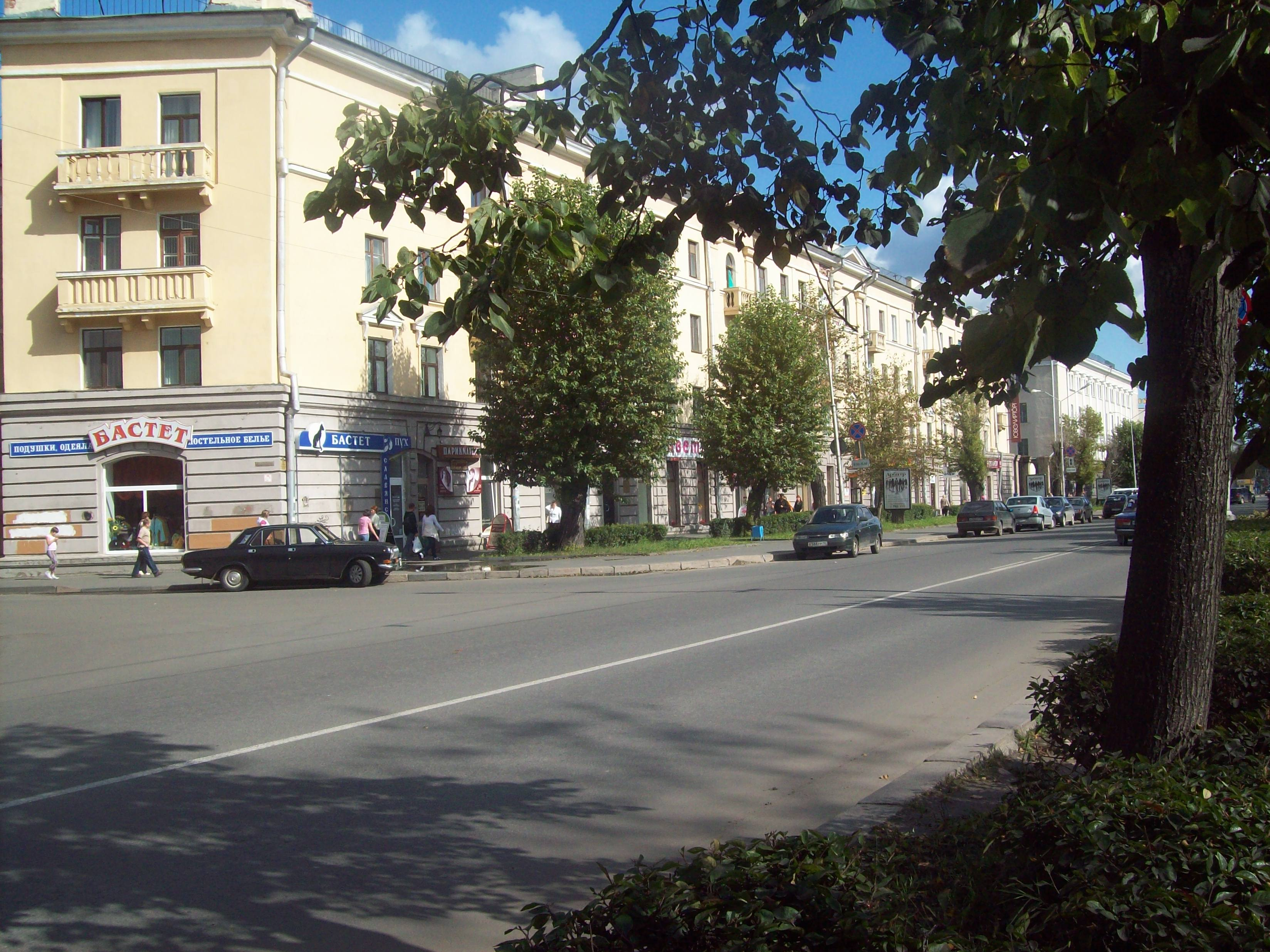
Residential building no. 20

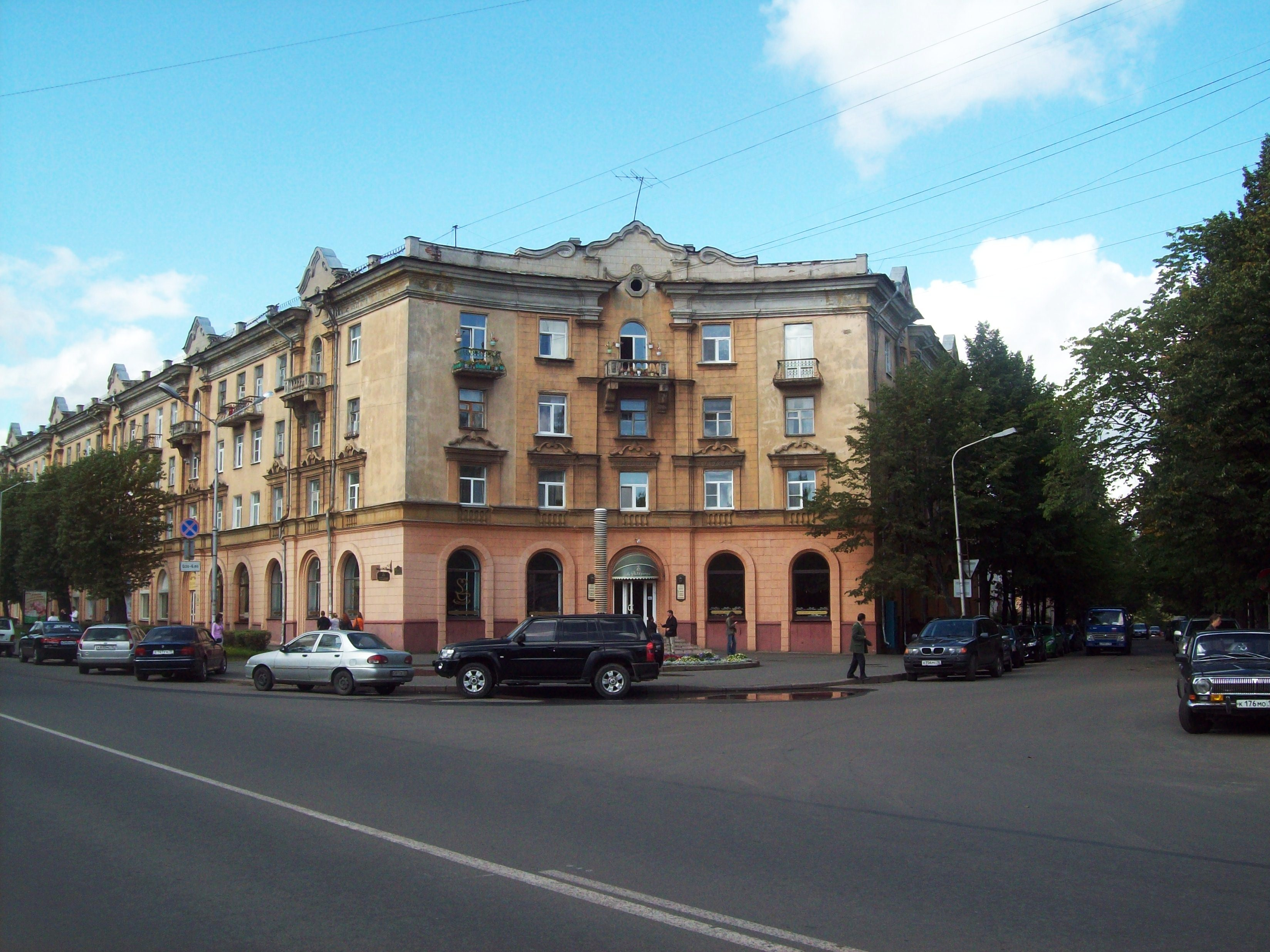
Residential building no. 22

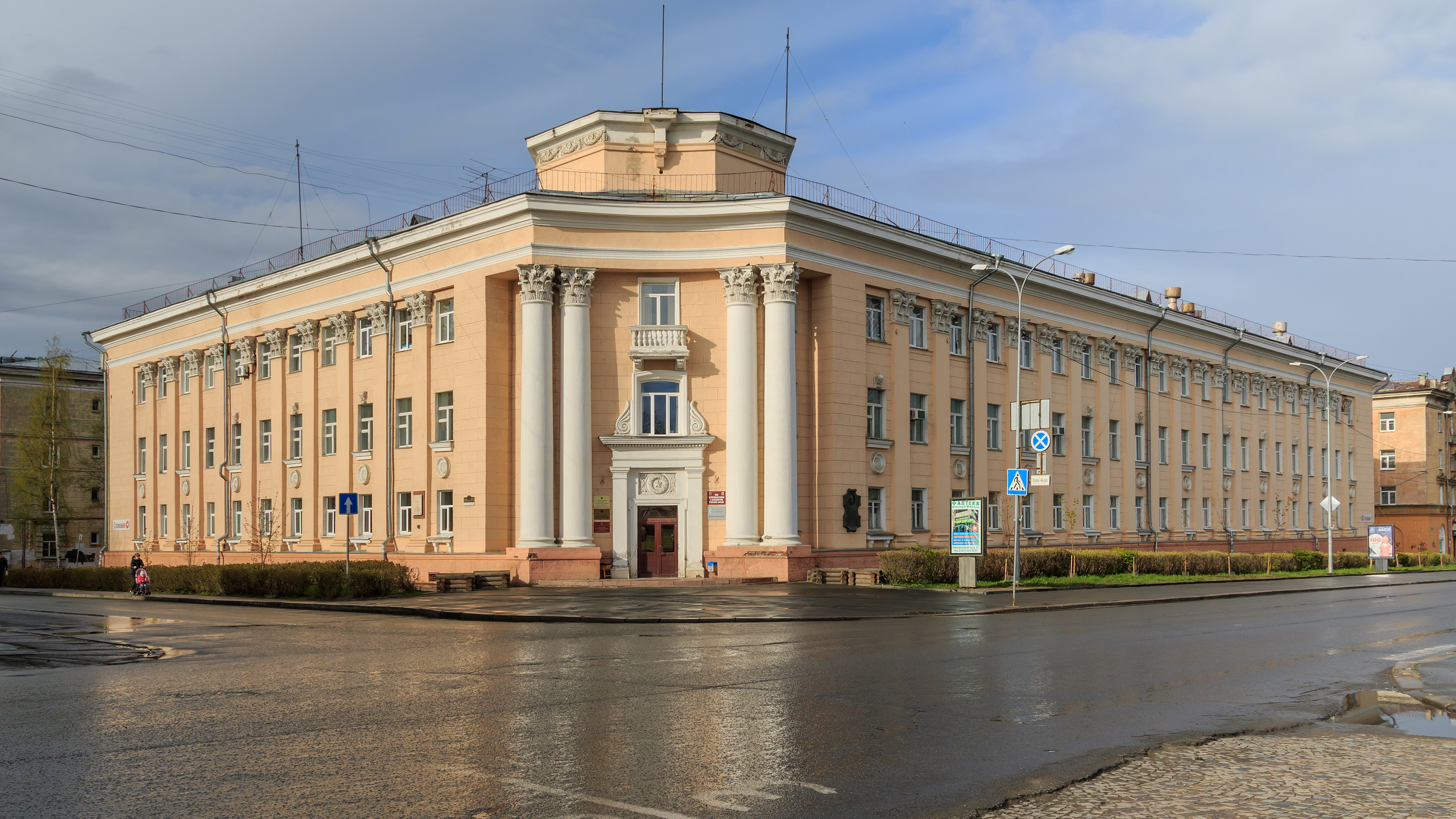
Building of the Ministries of Economic Development and Forestry of the Republic of Karelia

==== Lenin Square ====
The square is at the intersection of Karl Marx Avenue and Friedrich Engels Street. Over its more than two-hundred-year history, the square has had over a dozen names; it was renamed Lenin Square in 1969.

In the 1770s, eight stone administrative buildings were constructed on the square's territory (six separate two-story buildings and two outbuildings). They housed the factory office, mining commander, laboratory, school, and pharmacy. In 1782, administrative offices were transferred from Olonets to Petrozavodsk, and by decree of Catherine II, the buildings on the square were transferred from the mining department to the civil administration. In 1784, Petrozavodsk became a provincial center, and the square's buildings were reconstructed. Six of the eight buildings were merged into two long structures through additions. After reconstruction, the southwestern building housed the governor and vice-governor, while the northeastern building housed the general-governor, administrative offices, and the treasury chamber. In the early 19th century, the buildings suffered from fires and deteriorated. In the 1830s and 1840s, work was carried out to strengthen the buildings' architectural structures, build stone sidewalks, a fence connecting the guardhouses with semicircular buildings, extend corner outbuildings, and partially re-plan the premises. After reconstruction, the southwestern building served as the governor's residence, and the northeastern housed administrative offices. In 1873, a monument to Peter I designed by architect Shreder was erected in the center of the square. After the 1917 Revolution, the buildings housed the executive committee of the Council of Workers, Peasants, and Red Army Deputies of the Karelian Labor Commune, its departments, the people's court, the revolutionary tribunal, a state bank branch, and the military commissariat. The monument to Peter I was dismantled, and on November 7, 1933, a granite monument to Lenin was erected in its place. In 1969, the "Tomb of the Unknown Soldier" memorial complex with the Eternal Flame of Glory was built on the square. In the 1990s, the southwestern building housed the Karelian State Museum of Local History, and the northeastern building housed the Ministry of Culture and Public Relations of the Republic of Karelia and the Republican Center for National Cultures.

=== Mariinsky Boulevard and Yamka Park ===
Mariinsky Boulevard runs along the avenue, starting from the Unknown Soldier memorial and continuing down a steep slope to the Lososinka River. The idea of creating a boulevard along the entire Mariinsky Street belongs to Petrozavodsk Vice-Governor K.M. Shidlovsky and dates to 1905, when a tree-lined avenue of poplars was planted. Later, almost all poplars were replaced with linden trees, which adorn the boulevard to this day.

On September 24, 2021, a monument to the head of the Olonets Mining Factories, Charles Gascoigne (1737–1806), was unveiled on the boulevard.

Yamka Park (previously Onega Tractor Factory Park) is in a natural depression between Karl Marx Avenue, the Lososinka River, Lenin Square, and Kirov Square. It is a continuation of the boulevard. The park covers an area of 6.6 hectares. In the 18th century, this site was a sand quarry; it later became a dump for slag from the Alexander Factory. In 1934, a park was established, designed in a landscape style. There are currently plans for its further improvement.

==== Yunost Stadium ====
The stadium is east of the Onega Tractor Factory Park. Its area is 50,000 square meters. It includes a football field, basketball courts, volleyball courts, running tracks, a skate park, a reserve field, and an administrative building. The stadium was built in 1930. A major reconstruction took place from 2006 to 2009.

== Transport ==
Karl Marx Avenue is an important transport artery of the city. Bus services operate only on the section from Great Petropavlovskaya Street to Kirov Street and in one direction only (toward Lenin Square). There is one bus stop on the avenue (near residential building no. 12), served by routes nos. 8, 12, 17, 18, and 26. The history of bus services on the avenue began on May 9, 1915, when the city's first bus route was established, running from Aleksandrovskaya Street (now Alexander Nevsky Avenue) to Sulazhgora. Later that year, the route was discontinued but was intermittently resumed from Gostiny Dvor to the station (now Petrozavodsk-Tovarnaya station) in 1918 and 1922, and from 1927, buses from Gostiny Dvor ran regularly.

Trolleybus service on the avenue operates only within Kirov Square (route no. 4). Additionally, trolleybus routes cross the avenue on Kuibyshev Street (no. 1 from Chistaya Street to Kemskaya Street, no. 4 from Tovarnaya Station to Korabelov Street, and no. 7 from Chistaya Street to Korabelov Street).

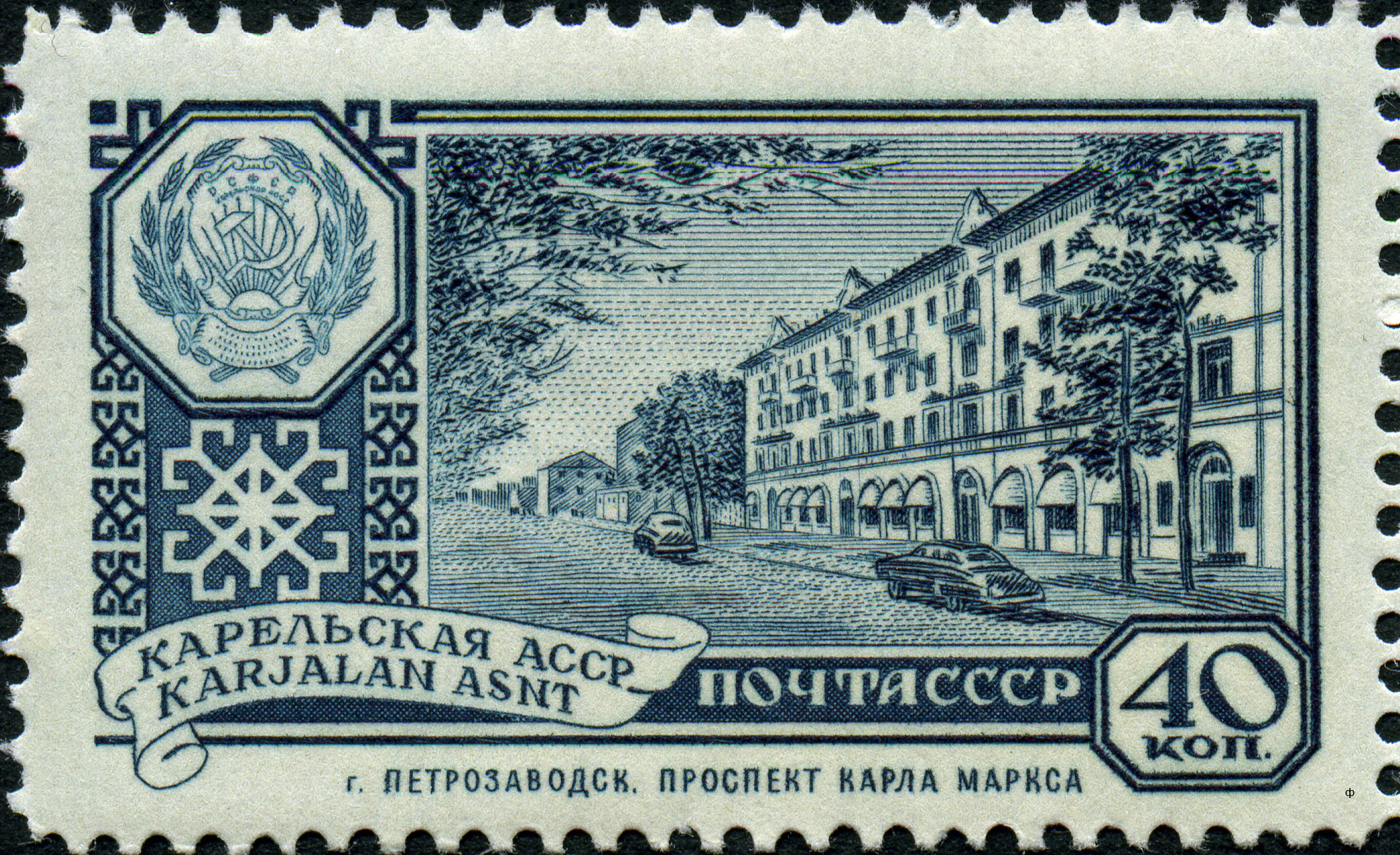
Karl Marx Avenue, Petrozavodsk, Karelian ASSR. USSR stamp, 1960

== The avenue in art and philately ==
- Karelian artist Zinovy Efimovich Lvovich painted two works depicting the avenue: "Karl Marx Avenue" (1953) and "New City" (1960).
- Artist Alexei Ivanovich Avdyshev painted a picture of the avenue in 1957.
- An image of house no. 22 on Karl Marx Avenue appears on a stamp, "Petrozavodsk", from the series "Capitals of Autonomous Soviet Socialist Republics" issued in 1960.

== Bibliography ==
- Solomonov, A.R. Karl Marx Avenue. Petrozavodsk, 1959
- Karelian State Museum of Local History (2003). A.M. Zhulnikov (ed.). Streets and Squares of Old Petrozavodsk [Улицы и площади старого Петрозаводска]. Petrozavodsk: Scandinavia Publishing. ISBN 5948040208.
- Filimonchik, S.N.; Goldenberg, M.L. (2003). History of Petrozavodsk: Textbook [История Петрозаводска: Учебное пособие]. Petrozavodsk: Karelia. ISBN 5754508301.
- Itsikson, Elena Evgenyevna (2003). "Nagornaya, English, Mariinsky" [Нагорная, Английская, Мариинская]. Liceum (Republican monthly newspaper) (4). Petrozavodsk: Karelia Publishing House. Archived from the original on 2010-12-31.
- Itsikson, Elena Evgenyevna. "Karl Marx Avenue in Petrozavodsk" [Проспект Карла Маркса в г. Петрозаводске]. Karelia (encyclopedia, volume 2). p. 439.
- Gayduk, S. G. (2017). Топонимы Петрозаводска [Toponyms of Petrozavodsk] (in Russian). Мoscow: Сам Полиграфист. p. 741. ISBN 978-5-00077-651-3.
