= Petrozavodsk State Glazunov Conservatoire =

Public music conservatory in Russia

Coordinates: 61.7954°N 34.3524°E

Petrozavodsk State Glazunov Conservatoire is a public music conservatory in Petrozavodsk, the Republic of Karelia, Russia.

The Petrozavodsk Conservatoire has around 100 faculty members and provides undergraduate and postgraduate training in music to its 600 students.

The Petrozavodsk Conservatoire has two associated orchestras and a choir: Petrozavodsk Conservatoire Symphony Orchestra, Petrozavodsk Conservatoire Folk Instruments Orchestra and Petrozavodsk Conservatoire Academic Choir.

== History ==
The Petrozavodsk Conservatoire was founded in 1967 as a branch of the Saint Petersburg Conservatory and became an independent higher education institution in 1991.

In 2013 it was named after the Russian composer Alexander Glazunov, former director of Saint Petersburg Conservatory.

== Directors and rectors ==
- Georgi Lapchinski (1967—1971)
- Vladimir Kasatkin (1971—1976)
- Vyachheslav Kalaberda (1977—1997)
- Sergei Sukhov (1997—2002)
- Vladimir Soloviev (2002—2018)
- Aleksei Kubyshkin (since 2018)

== International music competitions ==
- International Chopin Piano Competition for Young Pianists
- International "Silver Sounds" Contest for Woodwinds, Brass and Percussion
- International Folk Instruments Performers Competition "The Cup of the North" named after Albin Repnikov
- International Alexander Glazunov Youth Music Competition

== Departments ==
- Piano Solo
- Chamber Ensemble and Piano Accompaniment
- Strings
- Woodwind, Brass and Percussion instruments
- Folk Instruments
- Vocal Arts
- Conducting
- Music Theory and Composition
- Music History
- Finno-Ugric Music

== Alumni ==
- Alexander Lubyantsev, International Tchaikovsky Competition prize winner
- Yulia Matochkina, International Tchaikovsky Competition prize winner
- Nadezhda Pavlova
- Arina Vaganova
- Larisa Gabitova
- Yuri Klaz
- Mikhail Totsky
- Valentin Bogdanov
