= Kvasov =

Kvasov or Kvassov (feminine: Kvasova or Kvassova) is a Russian-language surname.

People with the surname include:

- Andrey Kvasov (c. 1720 – c. 1770), a notable Baroque architect who worked in Russia and Ukraine.
- Andrey Kvassov (b. 1976), a Kazakh swimmer.
- Sergei Kvasov (b. 1983), a Russian professional football player.
- Yaroslav Kvasov, Ukrainian footballer.
