= Constantia (ship) =

Several vessels have been named Constantia. The list below is in chronological order by year of launch.

- Constantia (1782 ship) was launched at Delft for the Dutch East India Company (VOC). She made several voyages between the Netherlands and the Dutch East Indies before the British Royal Navy captured her in 1795 when the British occupied Malacca.
- Constantia (1816 ship), was launched at Swansea in 1816. She sailed as a coaster, and across the Atlantic, making at least two voyages bringing immigrants to Canada. In April 1832, she was the first of four ships that arrived at Quebec within a month with passengers having died of cholera. She and the vessels that followed her introduced the 1826–1837 cholera pandemic to North America as it spread from Quebec to the rest of Canada and down to the United States. She was last listed in 1848.
- Constantia (1822 ship), of 22153/94, or 239 tons (bm), was built by Campbell and Shepphard in Wolfe's Cove. (Note: Charles Campbell and his brother-in-law William Shepphard maintained a lumber and shipyard at Wolfe's Cove from 1819 to 1830.) She sailed from Quebec, arrived at Bristol in mid-November 1822, and was sold there. Constantia sailed from Bristol in early March 1823. On 13 May, (Note: Farr has 10 May.) she was wrecked in Gabaron Bay, Cape Breton Island. The crew and all eight passengers were saved and reached shore. The point where the passengers and crew landed was some 40 miles (64 km) from Sydney, Nova Scotia. Local vessels took them there where they were well looked after. Six passengers eventually reached Quebec (one couple stayed at Sydney), on 8 June in the shallop Jane. Much of the cargo was also saved. On 14 and 15 July 1823 two schooners, Margaret and Lively, brought portions to Quebec, and on 14 October the immigrant brig Emperor Alexander, Watt, master, arrived from the wreck with the remainder of Constantia's stores and cargo.
- SS Constantia (1890), of 772 GRT was launched at Björneborg, Finland in 1890. British owners purchased her in 1918 for use as a coaster; SM UB-21 torpedoed and sank her on 5 May 1918.
- SS Constantia (1945) was a Victory-class cargo ship, one of three that founded the South African Marine Corporation in 1946.
