= Emperor Alexander (ship) =

In 1812 and after several ships were named Emperor Alexander for Emperor Alexander I, following his victory over Napoleon:

- Emperor Alexander (1812 ship) was launched in Sweden in 1808. She entered British records in 1812. She traded between Liverpool and Rotterdam and was last listed in 1820.
- Emperor Alexander (1812 Sunderland ship) was launched in Sunderland. She traded widely until she was wrecked in October 1821.
- Emperor Alexander (1813 ship) was launched at Amesbury, Massachusetts in 1811, as Fortune. She was taken in prize and was registered in Saint John, New Brunswick, in 1813 as Emperor Alexander. She was re-registered in Greenock, Scotland in 1814. She then traded between Greenock and the Americas, particularly Argentina. She was last listed in 1827.
- Emperor Alexander (1813 Chepstow ship) was launched in 1813 at Chepstow. Relatively early in her career she made two voyages to India and the East Indies under a license from the British East India Company (EIC). On her return she became a West Indiaman, and also sailed to South America, North America, and the Baltic. She carried immigrants to Quebec and transported convicts to Tasmania. She was condemned in 1835 following damage at sea on her way to the Cape of Good Hope and India.
- Emperor Alexander (1813 Scarborough ship) was launched in Scarborough. She traded to the Mediterranean, North America, and Brazil before suffering a maritime mishap in 1819. She was repaired and returned to service. She then sailed between Liverpool and Hamburg. She was last listed in 1827.
- Emperor Alexander (1814 Sunderland ship) was launched at Sunderland. She traded widely during which time she suffered some misfortunes, being plundered once and grounding once. In 1823 she carried settlers from Tobermory, Mull, to Quebec. She was wrecked in November 1832.
