= Peace Square =

The Peace Square may be:

- Peace Square, Prague, Czechia (Náměstí Míru)
- Peace Square, Sharm El Sheikh, Egypt (ميدان السلام)
- Peace Square, Guanajuato, Mexico (Plaza de la Paz)
- Sennaya Square, Saint Petersburg, Russia (Сeннáя плóщадь), known as Peace Square (Площадь мира) from 1952 to 1991
- Peace Square (Taiwan), Keelung, Taiwan
