= The guardhouse on Sennaya Square =

Building in Saint Petersburg

Coordinates: 59°55′40″N 30°19′09″E

- Гауптвахта на Сенной площади
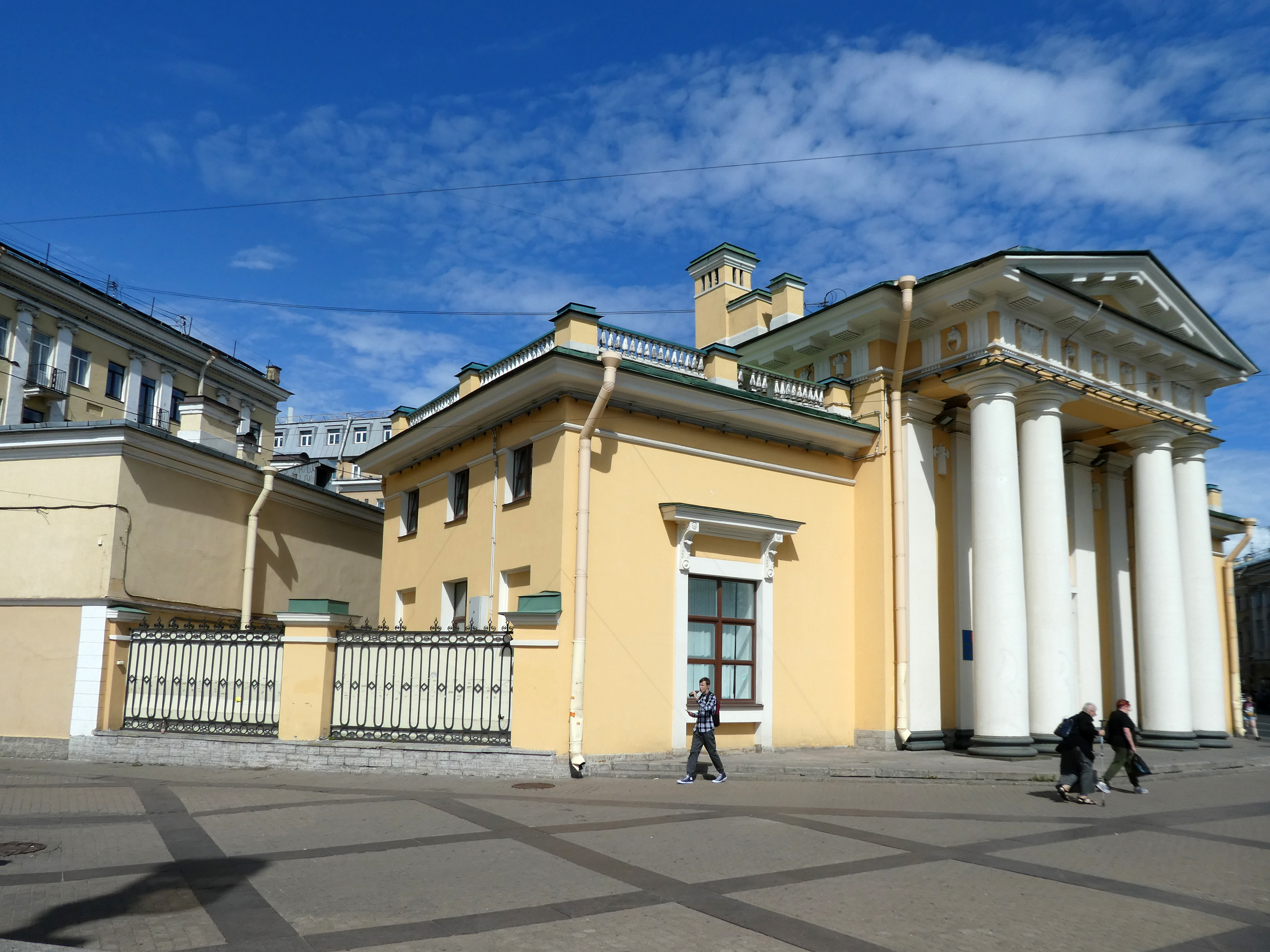
- Location: Saint Petersburg, Sadovaya Street, 37, Spassky Lane, 13, Sennaya Square 1х
- Type: building

The guardhouse on Sennaya Square is historic building in Saint Petersburg, located at Sennaya Square (Sadovaya Street, 37, Spassky Lane, 13).

== History ==
The original building of the guardhouse was constructed on Sennaya Square in the 18th century. The present structure was built in 1818–1820 by Vikenty Beretti; it is the only typical building of its kind preserved in Russian cities.

In March 1874, Fyodor Dostoevsky was here under arrest for censorship violations as the editor of the magazine "Grazhdanin". Corporal punishments of serfs from the 18th to the early 19th centuries took place on Sennaya Square right in front of the guardhouse's entrance.

Since 1886 (or since November 17, 1891), the building housed the City Sanitary-Analytical Station, which inspected products broughtto the square for sale. The laboratory operated daily from 8 a.m. to 5 p.m., except on holidays. The first floor housed the reception area, a large working hall (containing apparatuses and instruments), rooms for weighing and microscopic studies, and a 'hydrogen sulfide' room (with apparatuses for synthesizing hydrogen sulfide, a spectroscope, and a polarimeter). To furnish it, the City Administration bought equipment from private organizations, the Society for Public Health Protection, and Zverintsev's Analytical Station. From 1891 to 1895, senior laboratory assistant M. F. Shcherbakov lived on the second floor, and in 1895, the floor was allocated for the bacteriological department. In 1891, the building underwent internal reconstruction for the needs of the laboratory while preserving its external appearance. After 1917, the laboratory underwent several name changes.

Before World War I, the house housed a perfume-pharmacy store of the French firm Maison Frère.

"... during the flood [of 1924], water flooded the chemical department located on the 1st floor; in the working hall, water stood 48 cm above the floor. After the flood, the floor in the working hall began to threaten collapse". After renovation in 1926, a store was opened in the former guardhouse; in 1934, it became a grocery store, and from 1936, it was the construction office of Gorpromtorg, and from 1957 to 1987, it served as Intercity Bus Station No. 1. In 1994, a fire occurred in the reptile department of the Leningrad Zoo, prompting Anatoly Sobchak to allocate the guardhouse building for the terrarium. In 2004, a fire occurred again, this time at a new location, resulting in the deaths of approximately 150 reptiles. As of the 2020s, the building houses the City Tourist Information Bureau.

== Architecture ==
Facing the center of Sennaya Square, located in its northern corner, it was symmetrical to the entrance of Savior on Sennaya. Behind the main building, there were service buildings behind a metal fence. The main facade is adorned with a portico with four Tuscan columns (which harmonized with the nearby church) and reliefs with reliefs depicting military armor on the metopes.

== Gallery ==
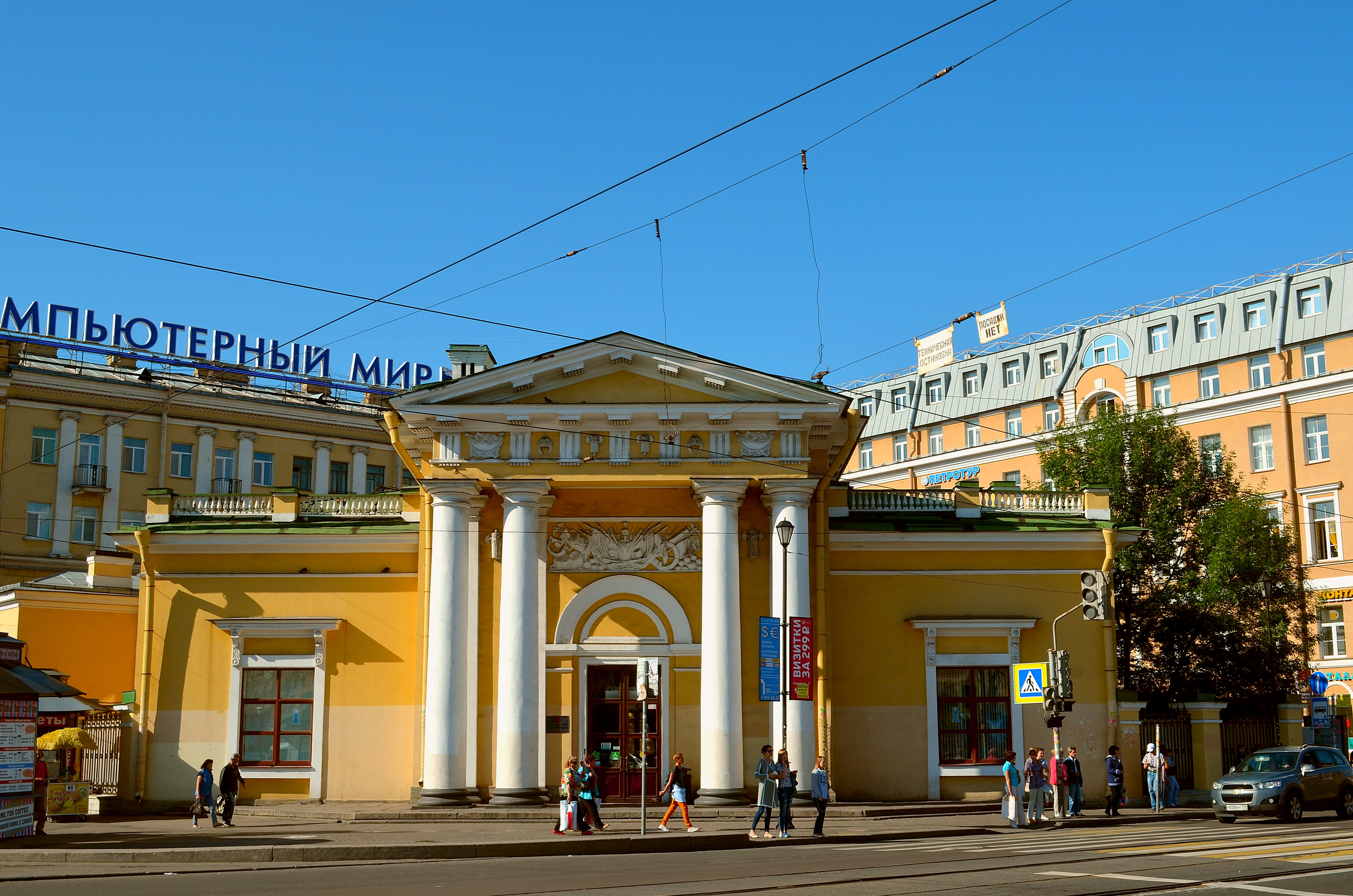
Front view

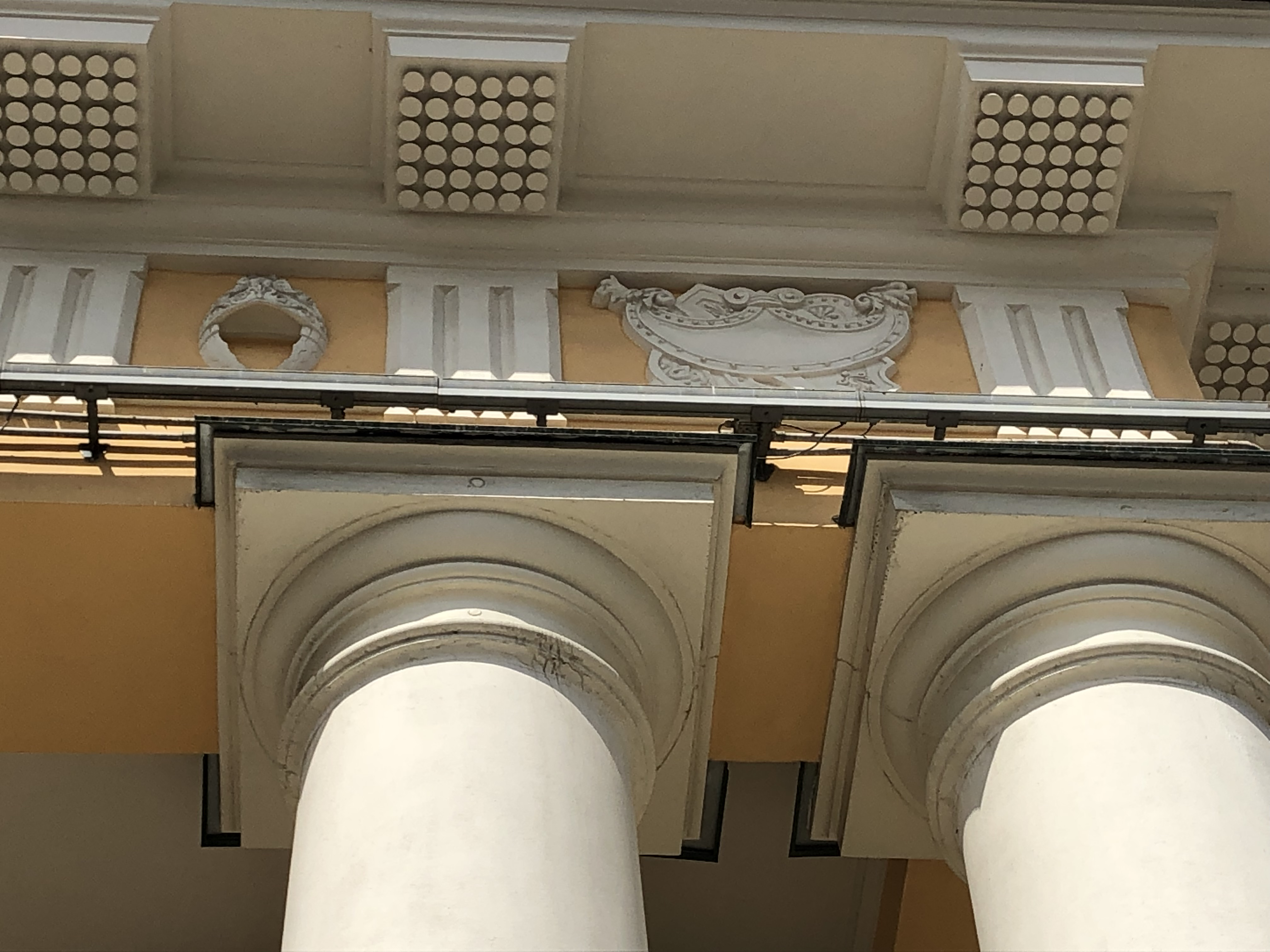
Portico decoration. Fragment

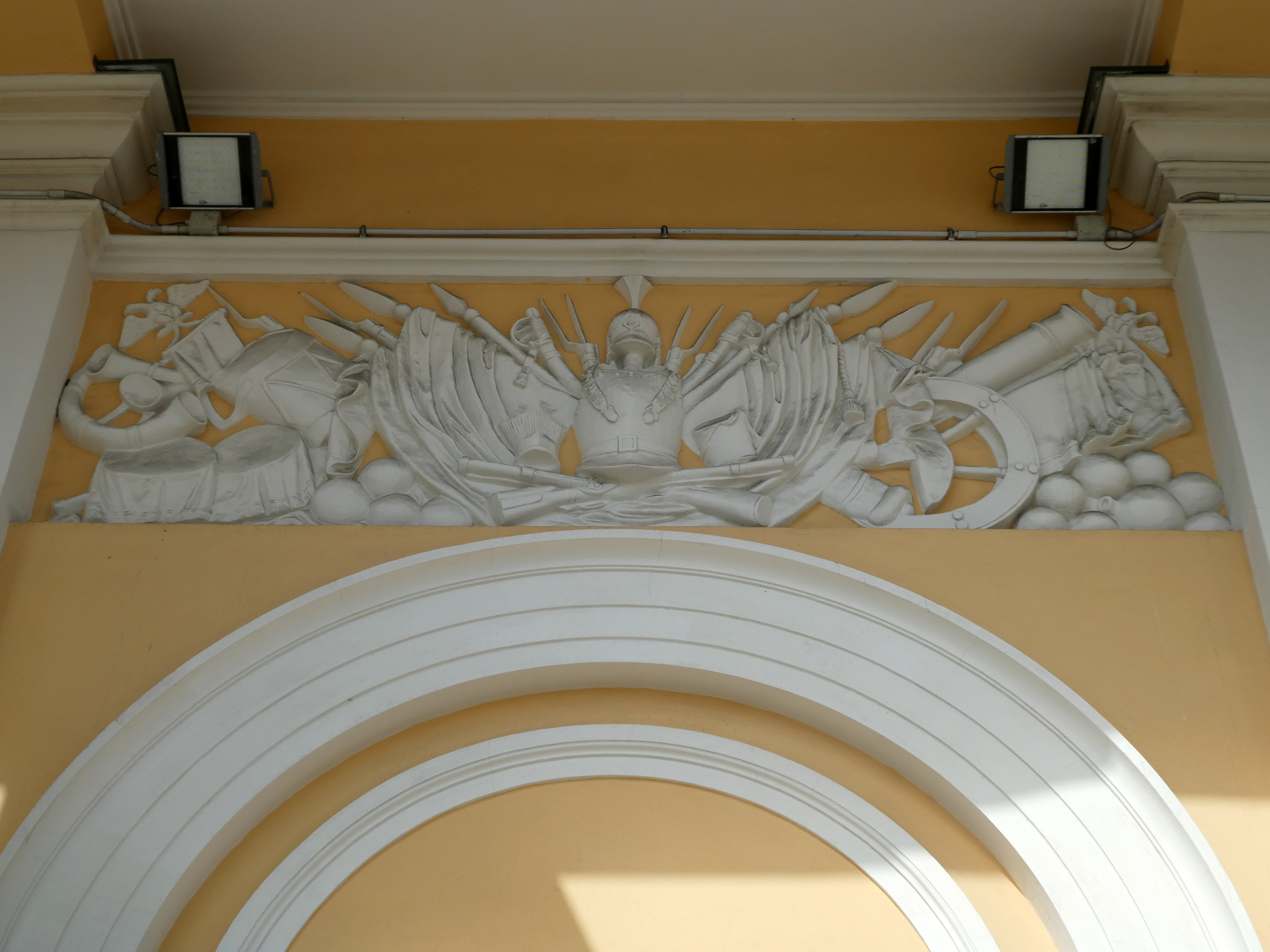
Reliefs on the metopes

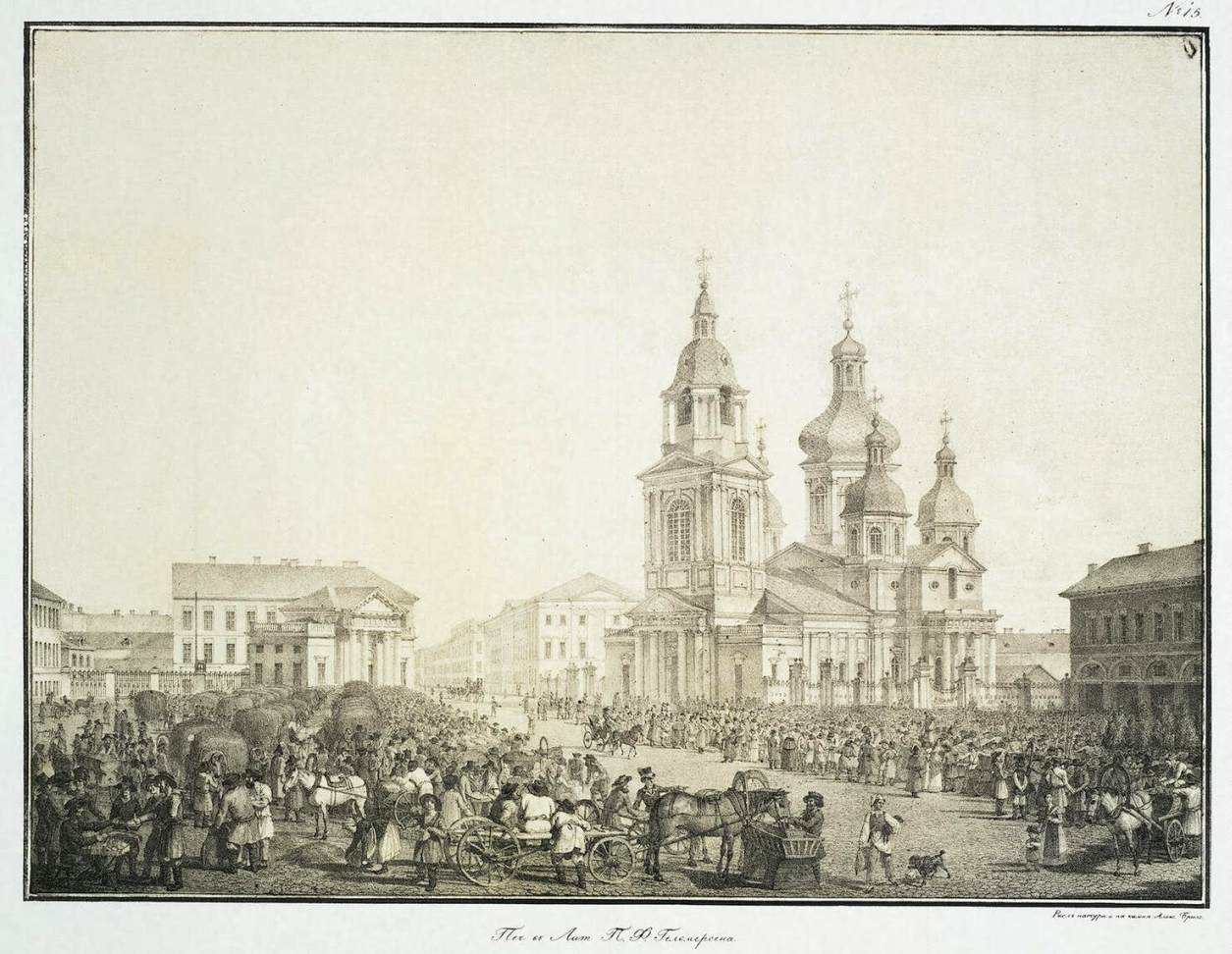
1822. Alexander Brullov, Sennaya Square

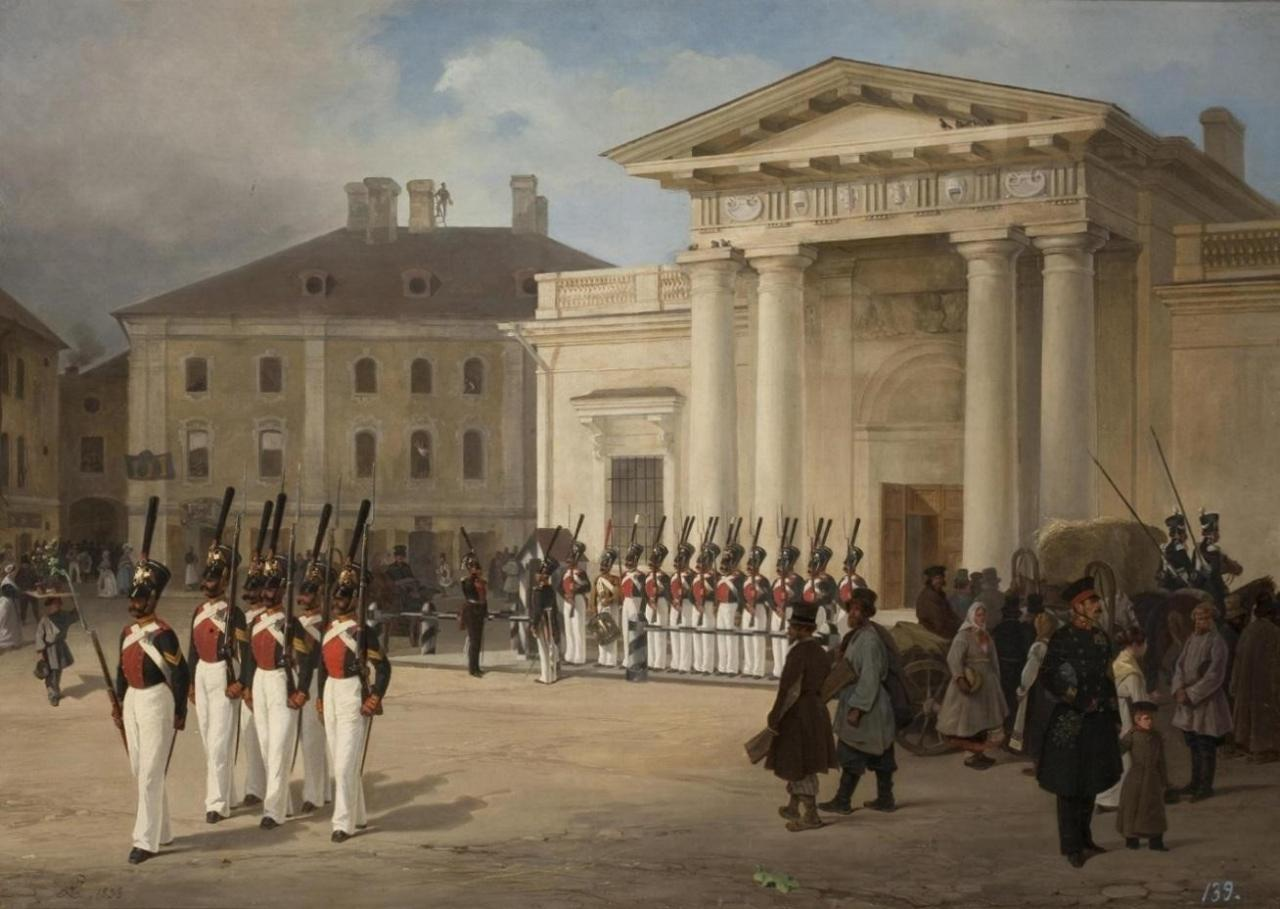
1838. Wilhelm-Adolf Ladurner. Changing of the guard of the Moscow Life Guards Regiment.

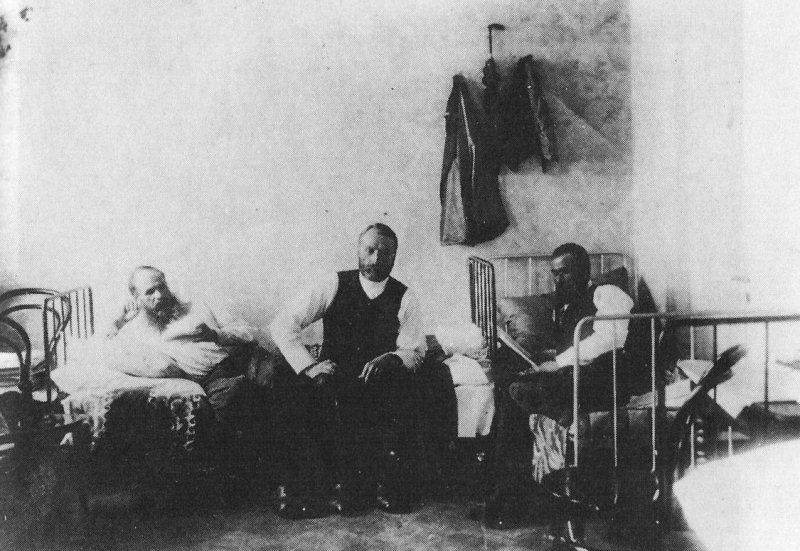
Dostoevsky during arrest

City laboratory. Room for hydrogen sulfide work. Room for weighing and microscopic work. Reception room

== Literature ==
- Канн П. Я. (1994). Прогулки по Петербургу. St. Petersburg: Палитра. p. 412. ISBN 5-289-01813-1.
- Петров А. Н., Борисова Е. А., Науменко А. П., Повелихина А. В. (1976). Памятники архитектуры Ленинграда (in Russian) (4th ed., rev. and add. ed.). Leningrad: Стройиздат. Ленинградское отделение. p. 576.
