= List of shipwrecks in November 1832 =

The list of shipwrecks in November 1832 includes ships sunk, foundered, grounded, or otherwise lost during November 1832.

== 1 November ==
List of shipwrecks: 1 November 1832
Ship	State	Description
Eclipse	United States	The ship was wrecked on the "Coloradas". Her crew were rescued. She was on a voyage from Tampico, Mexico to Philadelphia, Pennsylvania.
Mary Ann	United Kingdom	The ship was driven ashore at Cemaes, Anglesey. She was on a voyage from Youghal, County Cork to Liverpool, Lancashire.

== 2 November ==
List of shipwrecks: 2 November 1832
Ship	State	Description
Ibbotsons	United Kingdom	The ship foundered in the Norwegian Sea off Bergen, Norway. Her crew were rescued. She was on a voyage from Arkhangelsk, Russia to London.
Louise or Lovise	United Kingdom	The ship was driven ashore near Ringkobing, Denmark. Her crew were rescued. She was on a voyage from Hull, Yorkshire to Gothenburg, Sweden.

== 3 November ==
List of shipwrecks: 3 November 1832
Ship	State	Description
Aimwell	United States	The ship was lost on Grand Turk Island. Her crew were rescued. She was on a voyage from Boston, Massachusetts to British Honduras.
Cerez	Spain	The ship was driven ashore at Callantsoog, North Holland, Netherlands. She was on a voyage from Saint Thomas, Virgin Islands to Amsterdam, North Holland.

== 4 November ==
List of shipwrecks: 4 November 1832
Ship	State	Description
Helen and Mary Ann	United Kingdom	The ship was driven ashore near Ullapool, Ross-shire.
Howick	United Kingdom	The ship was wrecked on the "Little Tythers", in the Gulf of Finland. She was on a voyage from Narva, Russia to London.

== 5 November ==
List of shipwrecks: 5 November 1832
Ship	State	Description
Perseverance	United Kingdom	The ship was driven ashore and wrecked east of St. Ives, Cornwall with the loss of a crew member. She was on a voyage from Liverpool, Lancashire to Bremen.
Prince Eugene	flag unknown	The ship was wrecked on the Cruz del Padre Key. She was on a voyage from Rio Grande do Sul, Brazil to Havana, Cuba.
William the Fourth	United Kingdom	The ship was wrecked near Land's End, Cornwall. She was on a voyage from Newry, County Antrim to London.

== 6 November ==
List of shipwrecks: 6 November 1832
Ship	State	Description
Jubilee	United Kingdom	The ship struck a rock and was beached on Tresco, Isles of Scilly. She was on a voyage from Plymouth, Devon to Newport, Monmouthshire.

== 7 November ==
List of shipwrecks: 7 November 1832
Ship	State	Description
David	United Kingdom	The barque was wrecked in the Saint Lawrence River.
Ulysses	Netherlands	The ship was driven ashore at Ostend, West Flanders, Belgium.

== 9 November ==
List of shipwrecks: 9 November 1832
Ship	State	Description
Floyd	United States	The ship was wrecked on Cape Sable Island, Nova Scotia, British North America. She was on a voyage from a Russian port to Boston, Massachusetts.
John Lawes	(United Kingdom of Great Britain and Ireland) British North America	The brig was abandoned in the Atlantic Ocean. Her crew were rescued by Balclutha (United Kingdom). John Lawes was on a voyage from Liverpool, Lancashire, United Kingdom to Saint John, New Brunswick.
Orion	United Kingdom	The ship caught fire in the Bristol Channel. She was beached at Whitson, Monmouthshire where she was destroyed. Her crew survived.

== 10 November ==
List of shipwrecks: 10 November 1832
Ship	State	Description
Ascencion do Maio	Spain	The ship was wrecked at "Viera". She was on a voyage from Valencia to Vigo.
Boyne	United Kingdom	The ship was in collision with a sloop and sank in the Humber at North Ferriby, Yorkshire. She was on a voyage from London to Leeds, Yorkshire. Boyne was later refloated and taken in to Hull, Yorkshire.
Busy Bee	United Kingdom	The ship was driven ashore near Campbeltown, Argyllshire. She was on a voyage from Bangor to Berwick upon Tweed, Northumberland.
Captain	United Kingdom	The schooner was driven ashore and wrecked at the Bullers of Buchan, Aberdeenshire with the loss of all hands She was on a voyage from Sunderland, County Durham to Aberdeen.
Dartmouth	United Kingdom	The ship was wrecked near Rye, Sussex with the loss of six lives. She was on a voyage from Dartmouth, Devon to London.
England	United Kingdom	The ship was driven ashore and severely damaged at South Shields, County Durham. She was later refloated and taken in to port.
Grape	United Kingdom	The sloop foundered in the Bristol Channel 11 nautical miles (20 km) off Mumbles Head, Glamorgan. Her crew were rescued by Ugic (United Kingdom). Grape was on a voyage from Newport, Monmouthshire to Appledore, Devon.
Hope	United Kingdom	The brig struck rocks and sank at "Fairhead". Her crew were rescued. She was on a voyage from Glasgow, Renfrewshire to Limerick.
Inverness	United Kingdom	The ship was wrecked on the Spanish Battery, off Hartlepool, County Durham. She was on a voyage from South Shields to Inverness.
Richard	United Kingdom	The ship was driven ashore near Skegness, Lincolnshire. Her crew were rescued. she was on a voyage from King's Lynn, Norfolk to Wakefield, Yorkshire.
Trinity	United States	The ship was lost near "Ottakapas". All on board were rescued. She was on a voyage from Bordeaux, Gironde, France to New Orleans, Louisiana.
Wellington	United Kingdom	The ship was wrecked on the Whitton Sand, in the North Sea. She was later driven ashore at Whitton, Lincolnshire. She was on a voyage from King's Lynn to Goole, Yorkshire.
Vrow Anna	Belgium	The ship was driven ashore and wrecked on the east coast of Saaremaa, Russia. She was on a voyage from Saint Petersburg, Russia to Antwerp

== 11 November ==
List of shipwrecks: 11 November 1832
Ship	State	Description
Amelia	United Kingdom	The ship struck a rock off Solva, Pembrokeshire and sank. Her crew were rescued. She was on a voyage from Cork to Newport, Monmouthshire.

== 12 November ==
List of shipwrecks: 12 November 1832
Ship	State	Description
Active	United Kingdom	The ship was driven ashore near Theddlethorpe, Lincolnshire. Her crew were rescued. She was on a voyage from London to Goole, Yorkshire. Active was later refloated and taken in to Hull, Yorkshire.

== 13 November ==
List of shipwrecks: 13 November 1832
Ship	State	Description
Gleaner	United Kingdom	The ship was abandoned in the Atlantic Ocean. Her crew were rescued by Hannibal (United States). Gleaner was on a voyage from Quebec City, Lower Canada, British North America to Cork.
Juno	United Kingdom	The ship was driven ashore near Sowerby, Yorkshire. She was on a voyage from London to Perth.
Margaret and Ann	United Kingdom	The schooner was wrecked on Inch, Wigtownshire. Her crew were rescued.

== 14 November ==
List of shipwrecks: 14 November 1832
Ship	State	Description
Guardian	United Kingdom	The ship ran aground on the Whitton Sand, in the North Sea off the coast of Lincolnshire. Her crew were rescued. Guardian was later refloated and resumed her voyage from Great Yarmouth, Norfolk to Gainsborough, Lincolnshire.
Hermes	France	The ship was wrecked at Figueira da Foz, Portugal. She was on a voyage from Marseille, Bouches-du-Rhône to Nantes, Loire-Inférieure.

== 16 November ==
List of shipwrecks: 16 November 1832
Ship	State	Description
General Phipps	United Kingdom	The ship was driven ashore at "Mauban". She was on a voyage from Pugwash, Nova Scotia, British North America to London.
Petit Parie	France	The ship was wrecked north of Figueira da Foz, Portugal. She was on a voyage from Havre de Grâce, Seine-Inférieure to Lisbon, Portugal.

== 17 November ==
List of shipwrecks: 17 November 1832
Ship	State	Description
Albion Packet	United Kingdom	The ship was driven ashore near Orford Haven, Suffolk. Her crew were rescued. She was on a voyage from Maldon, Essex to Sunderland, County Durham.
Boulby	United Kingdom	The ship was driven ashore north of Scalby Ness, Yorkshire. She was refloated on 21 November and taken in to Whitby.
Harvey	United Kingdom	The ship was driven ashore three leagues (9 nautical miles (17 km) east of Calais, France. She was on a voyage from Hull, Yorkshire to Terceira, Spain. Harvey was refloated on 21 November and taken in to Calais.
Mary Ann	United Kingdom	The ship was driven ashore at Miramichi, New Brunswick, British North America.
Newbiggin	United Kingdom	The ship sprand a leak and foundered in the North Sea off Huntley, Aberdeenshire.

== 18 November ==
List of shipwrecks: 18 November 1832
Ship	State	Description
Alexander	United States	The ship was lost in the Atlantic Ocean off Cape Florida. Her crew were rescued. She was on a voyage from Havana, Cuba to Málaga, Spain.
Unity	United Kingdom	The ship was wrecked on the Pentland Skerries, Orkney Islands. Her crew were rescued.

== 19 November ==
List of shipwrecks: 19 November 1832
Ship	State	Description
Bellona	United Kingdom	The ship was driven ashore near Ystad, Sweden. She was on a voyage from London to Pori, Grand Duchy of Finland.

== 20 November ==
List of shipwrecks: 20 November 1832
Ship	State	Description
Clyde	United Kingdom	The ship was wrecked on the Maiden Rocks, near Belfast, County Antrim. Her crew were rescued. She was on a voyage from Belfast to Demerara.
Corsenside	United Kingdom	The ship ran aground on the Holme Bank, in the North Sea off the coast of Norfolk. Her crew were rescued by the Great Yarmouth Lifeboat. She was on a voyage from Saint Petersburg, Russia to London. Corsenside was refloated on 24 November and proceeded on her voyage.
Neptune	United Kingdom	The ship ran aground on the Corton Sand, in the North Sea off the coast of Suffolk and sank.
Thomas Richardson	United Kingdom	The brig was driven ashore at Burniston, Yorkshire. She was refloated on 28 November and towed in to Whitby, Yorkshire, where she sank.
Trader	United Kingdom	The sloop was driven ashore and wrecked at Fraserburgh, Aberdeenshire She was on a voyage from Aberdeen to Rosehearty, Aberdeenshire.
Tweed	United Kingdom	The ship was driven ashore on Long Island, New York, United States. She was on a voyage from Pictou, Nova Scotia, British North America to New York City.
Union	United Kingdom	The ship was driven ashore at Kronstadt, Russia.

=== 21 November ===
List of shipwrecks: 21 November 1832
Ship	State	Description
Lune	United Kingdom	The ship was wrecked on the south coast of "St. Domery". All on board were rescued. She was on a voyage from London to Jamaica.

== 22 November ==
List of shipwrecks: 22 November 1832
Ship	State	Description
Emperor Alexander	United Kingdom	The brig was wrecked on the Arklow Bank, in the Irish Sea. Her crew were rescued. She was on a voyage from Quebec City, Lower Canada, British North America to London. The abandoned floating hulk was towed into Kingstown, County Dublin.
Eugenia	France	The ship was driven ashore near Toulon, Var. She was on a voyage from Söderhamn, Sweden to Sète, Hérault.
Malta	United Kingdom	The ship was driven ashore and wrecked at Wexford. She was on a voyage from Miramichi, New Brunswick, British North America to Wexford.

== 23 November ==
List of shipwrecks: 23 November 1832
Ship	State	Description
Adams	United States	The ship was driven ashore near "Wanset". She was on a voyage from Amsterdam, North Holland, Netherlands to Boston, Massachusetts.
Bon Père	France	The ship was wrecked near Toulon, Var. She was on a voyage from Saint-Malo, Finistère to Marseille, Bouches-du-Rhône.
Caledonia	United Kingdom	The steamship was in collision with a brig and sank in the River Ouse near Goole, East Riding of Yorkshire. All on board were rescued. She was on a voyage from Hull, Yorkshire to Goole.
Elise	United Kingdom	The ship was wrecked near Toulon.
Emélie	France	The ship was driven ashore and wrecked at New Romney, Kent, United Kingdom. She was on a voyage from Dunkirk, Nord to Bordeaux, Gironde.
Jane	(United Kingdom of Great Britain and Ireland) Barbados	The schooner was wrecked near Saint Thomas, Virgin Islands. All on board were rescued.

== 24 November ==
List of shipwrecks: 24 November 1832
Ship	State	Description
Abeona	United Kingdom	The ship sprang a leak and was abandoned in the Atlantic Ocean. Her crew were rescued by Spinster (United Kingdom). Abeona was on a voyage from London to Wilmington, Delaware, United States.
Laura	United Kingdom	The ship was wrecked on Öland, Sweden. She was on a voyage from Riga, Russia to Lübeck.
Providence	United Kingdom	The ship sprang a leak and foundered in the Irish Sea off Holyhead, Anglesey. Her crew were rescued. She was on a voyage from Mostyn, Flintshire to Nefyn, Caernarfonshire.
Susan and Mary	United Kingdom	The ship was run down and sunk in the English Channel off the Isle of Wight by Thetis (United Kingdom), which rescued her crew. Susan and Mary was on a voyage from Bilbao, Spain to London.

== 25 November ==
List of shipwrecks: 25 November 1832
Ship	State	Description
Ant	United Kingdom	The ship was driven ashore near Harrington, Cumberland. She was refloated on 11 December.
Economy	United Kingdom	The ship was driven ashore near Harrington. She was refloated on 11 December.
Eliza Ann	United Kingdom	The ship was driven ashore near Harrington. She was refloated on 11 December.
Musgrave	United Kingdom	The ship was driven ashore near Harrington. She was refloated on 11 December.
Occident	Hamburg	The ship was wrecked on the Mewen Sand. Her crew were rescued. She was on a voyage from Çeşme, Ottoman Empire to Hamburg.
Swiss	United Kingdom	The ship was run down and sunk in the North Sea by the brig Robert Peel. Her crew were rescued. Swiss was on a voyage from Sunderland, County Durham to London.
Utility	United Kingdom	The ship was driven ashore near Harrington.

== 26 November ==
List of shipwrecks: 26 November 1832
Ship	State	Description
Robert	(United Kingdom of Great Britain and Ireland) British North America	The ship was wrecked on "Jersey Isle", Nova Scotia. She was on a voyage from Pictou, Nova Scotia to Boston, Massachusetts, United States.
Superb	United Kingdom	The ship was driven ashore and wrecked near Sligo. She was on a voyage from Glasgow, Renfrewshire to Sligo.
Two Brothers	United Kingdom	The ship foundered off "Rockcliff". Her crew were rescued by Romulus (United Kingdom).

== 27 November ==
List of shipwrecks: 27 November 1832
Ship	State	Description
Ludwig	Norway	The ship was driven ashore near Varberg, Sweden. Her crew were rescued. She was on a voyage from Copenhagen to a Mediterranean port.
Mary Ann	United Kingdom	The ship was lost on the coast of Newfoundland, British North America. She was on a voyage from Miramichi, New Brunswick, British North America to Liverpool, Lancashire.

== 28 November ==
List of shipwrecks: 28 November 1832
Ship	State	Description
Adelaide	United Kingdom	The pilot schooner was lost off Pladda, Ayrshire. Her crew were rescued.
Agnes	United Kingdom	The ship was driven ashore and wrecked in Hull Bay near Padstow, Cornwall. She was on a voyage from Newry, County Antrim to London.
Blossom	United Kingdom	The sloop was driven ashore in Culzean Bay, Ayrshire. Her crew were rescued. She was on a voyage from Newry to Troon, Ayrshire.
Cholmely	United Kingdom	The ship struck a sunken wreck on the Gunfleet Sand, in the North Sea off the coast of Essex. She was consequently beached at Bawdsey, Suffolk. She was on a voyage from London to South Shields, County Durham. She was refloated on 30 November and taken in to Bawdsey.
Clio	United Kingdom	The ship was driven ashore and wrecked in the River Severn at Sharpness, Gloucestershire. She was on a voyage from Richibucto, New Brunswick, British North America to Gloucester.
Janet	United Kingdom	The ship was driven ashore on Islay, Inner Hebrides. She was on a voyage from Glasgow, Renfrewshire to Killala, County Mayo.
Joseph and Mary	United Kingdom	The ship departed from Youghal, County Cork for London. No further trace, presumed foundered with the loss of all hands.
Margaret Paterson	United Kingdom	The ship was driven ashore on Islay. She was on a voyage from Londonderry to Islay.
Mary	United Kingdom	The ship was driven ashore and wrecked on Oronsay, Inner Hebrides.
Olive Branch	United Kingdom	The ship was driven ashore near Boulogne, Pas-de-Calais, France. Her crew were rescued. She was on a voyage from Seville, Spain to London.
Rival	United Kingdom	The troopship was wrecked near Galway with the loss of about 420 lives. She was on a voyage from the Clyde to Porto, Portugal.
Thomson	United Kingdom	The ship was driven ashore and wrecked on Saltholm, Denmark. She was on a voyage from Saint Petersburg, Russia to London.

== 29 November ==
List of shipwrecks: 29 November 1832
Ship	State	Description
Crown	United Kingdom	The ship was driven ashore at Swansea, Glamorgan.
Eliza	United Kingdom	The ship foundered in the North Sea off Robin Hoods Bay, Yorkshire. Her crew were rescued.
Female	United Kingdom	The ship foundered in the North Sea off Huntly, Aberdeenshire. Her crew were rescued by Waterloo (United Kingdom).
Henry	United Kingdom	The brig was driven ashore near Kirktownhead, Aberdeenshire. Her crew survived. She was on a voyage from Conwy, Caernarfonshire to Sunderland, County Durham.
Mary	United Kingdom	The ship was driven ashore and wrecked on Oronsay, Inner Hebrides.
San Miguel Entrepido or Santa Miguel el Tritrepedio	Spain	The ship was wrecked on Barra, Outer Hebrides, United Kingdom. Her crew were rescued. She was on a voyage from Bergen, Norway to Bilbao.
St. Michael or Santa Miguel el Tritrepedio	Kingdom of the Two Sicilies	The ship was driven ashore and wrecked on Barra or South Uist, Outer Hebrides. She was on a voyage from Bergen, Norway to Naples.
St. Sauveur	France	The ship was wrecked on a reef near Ceará, Brazil. She was on a voyage from Havre de Grâce, Seine-Inférieure to Maranhão, Brazil.
Wilhelmina	Stettin	The ship was wrecked near Karlskrona, Sweden. She was on a voyage from Pärnu, Russia to Stettin.

== 30 November ==
List of shipwrecks: 30 November 1832
Ship	State	Description
Grasson	Norway	The ship was driven ashore near Sligo, United Kingdom. She was on a voyage from Bergen to Naples, Kingdom of the Two Sicilies.
Helena	United Kingdom	The ship sprang a leak and was abandoned in the North Sea 30 nautical miles (56 km) east south east of Flamborough Head, Yorkshire.
Henry	United Kingdom	The ship was driven ashore near The Needles, Isle of Wight. She was refloated on 3 December and taken in to Cowes, Isle of Wight. Henry was on a voyage from Southampton, Hampshire to Jersey, Channel Islands.
Northumberland	United Kingdom	The ship was wrecked on the Whiting Sand, in the North Sea off the coast of Suffolk. Her crew were rescued. She was on a voyage from Seaton Sluice, County Durham to London.

== Unknown date ==
List of shipwrecks: Unknown date 1832
Ship	State	Description
Agnes	United Kingdom	The ship was driven ashore and wrecked on Porteynon Point, Glamorgan.
Atlantic	Russia	The ship was driven ashore and wrecked on the Kola Peninsula. Her crew survived She was on a voyage from Arkhangelsk to London, United Kingdom.
Bellona	France	The ship was wrecked on Ameland, Friesland, Netherlands. Her crew were rescued. She was on a voyage from Vyborg, Grand Duchy of Finland to Marseille, Bouches-du-Rhône.
Breeze	United Kingdom	The ship was wrecked at Pointe des Monts, Lower Canada, British North America. She was on a voyage from London to Quebec City, Lower Canada.
General Ricaforte	United States	The ship was wrecked in the Abaco Islands. She was on a voyage from Havana, Cuba to Charleston, South Carolina.
Lallah Rooke	United Kingdom	The ship was wrecked on Götaland, Sweden in late November. Her crew were rescued. She was on a voyage from Riga, Russia to Londonderry.
Lowther	United Kingdom	The steamship was driven ashore at Great Yarmouth, Norfolk. She was on a voyage from Hull, Yorkshire to Great Yarmouth. She was later refloated.
Nicholas	United Kingdom	The ship was driven ashore near Dragø, Denmark. She was on a voyage from Riga, Russia to Newcastle upon Tyne, Northumberland.
Occidente	France	The ship was driven ashore and wrecked near Otterndorf, Duchy of Holstein.
Princess Mary	United Kingdom	The whaler was lost on Aldabra, Seychelles.
Sicilian	France	The ship was wrecked at Catania, Sicily before 14 November.
Vera Cruzana	Mexico	The ship was wrecked on Annegada de Fuerzo before 22 November. She was on a voyage from Veracruz to Tampico.
Water Witch	United Kingdom	The ship foundered off Amrum, Kingdom of Hanover in early November. She was on a voyage from Cephalonia, Greece to Hamburg.
