= Andrey Kvasov =

Russian architect (c. 1720 – c. 1770)

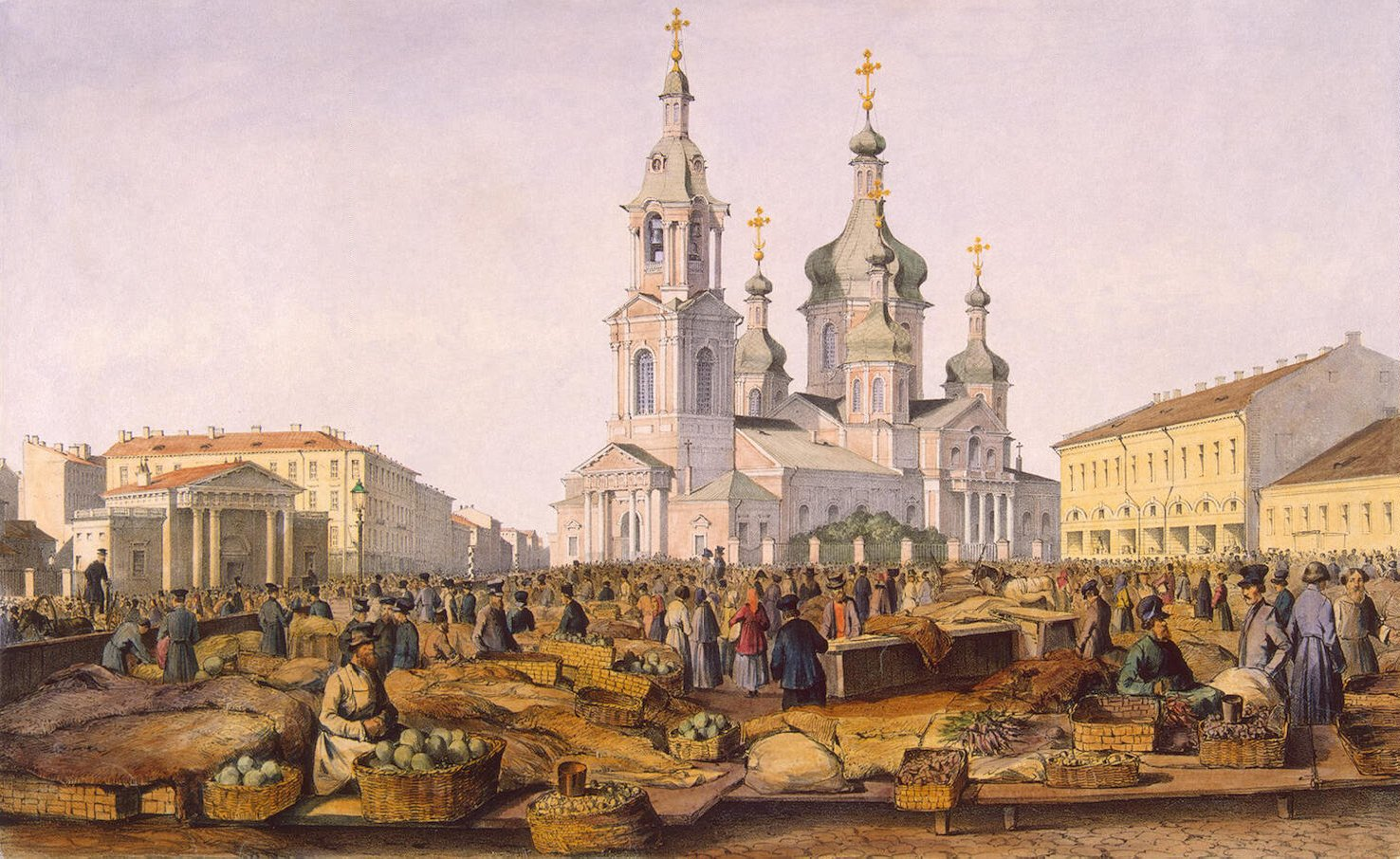
Church on Hay Square in St Petersburg, attributed to Kvasov and demolished by Soviet authorities in the 1930s

Andrey Vasilievich Kvasov (Russian: Андрей Васильевич Квасов, c. 1720 – c. 1770) was a Russian Baroque architect who worked in Russia, including the territory of modern-day Ukraine. Very little is known about his life, and its dates are still uncertain. Only a handful of his buildings, though much altered, still stand.

== Career ==
In 1741, Kvasov helped Mikhail Zemtsov to prepare coronation celebrations in Moscow. Two years later, he was entrusted with interior decoration of the Catherine Palace, which resulted in the Grand Ball Hall and other celebrated rooms. The Saviour Church on Hay Square, Znamenka Palace, and the palace of Aleksey Bestuzhev are also attributed to Kvasov.

Aleksey Razumovsky was Kvasov's long-time employer. In 1748 he went to the court of the Ukrainian hetman Kirill Razumovsky, Aleksey's brother, to design the residences and churches in Baturin, Glukhov, and Koselets. In 1770, he was made Principal Architect of Little Russia. The cathedral in Kozelets is his major surviving work in the Ukrainian Baroque idiom.

Kvasov's younger brother Aleksei is credited with devising the general layout of Kazan (1766), Tver (1767), Astrakhan (1768), Kharkov (1768), and the Admiralty part of St Petersburg.
