= 1826–1837 cholera pandemic =

Worldwide outbreak of cholera

Second cholera pandemic
- Disease: Cholera
- Pathogen: Vibrio cholerae
- Location: Asia, Europe, the Americas
- First outbreak: Ganges Delta, British India
- Dates: 1826–1837
- Confirmed cases: Unknown; 250,000 in Russia
- Deaths: Unknown; 100,000 in Russia; 100,000 in France; 6,536 in London

The second cholera pandemic (1826–1837), also known as the Asiatic cholera pandemic, was a cholera pandemic that reached from India across Western Asia to Europe, Great Britain, and the Americas, as well as east to China and Japan. Cholera caused more deaths than any other epidemic disease in the 19th century, and as such, researchers consider it a defining epidemic disease of the century. The medical community now believes cholera to be exclusively a human disease, spread through many means of travel during the time, and transmitted through warm fecal-contaminated river waters and contaminated foods. During the second pandemic, the scientific community varied in its beliefs about the causes of cholera.

== History ==
=== First pandemic ===
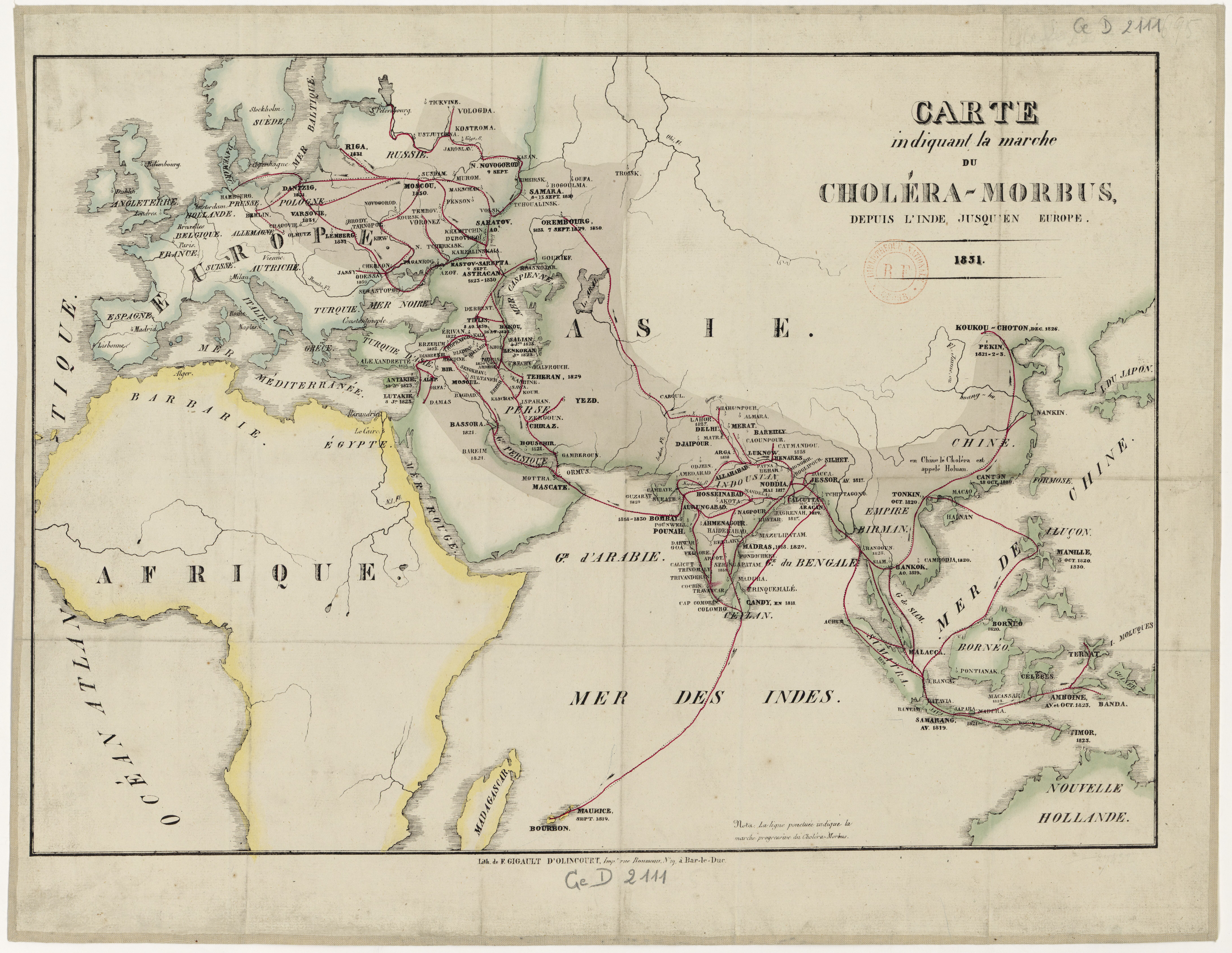
Cholera dissemination across Asia and Europe in 1817–1831

The first cholera pandemic (1817–24) began near Kolkata and spread throughout Southeast Asia to the Middle East, eastern Africa, and the Mediterranean coast. While cholera had spread across India many times previously, this outbreak went farther; it reached as far as China and the Mediterranean Sea before receding. Hundreds of thousands of people died as a result of this pandemic, including many British soldiers from the presidency armies, which attracted European attention. This was the first of several cholera pandemics to sweep through Asia and Europe during the 19th and 20th centuries. This first pandemic spread over an unprecedented range of territory, affecting many countries throughout Asia.

=== Origins of the second pandemic ===
Historians believe that the first pandemic had lingered in Indonesia and the Philippines in 1830.

Although not much is known about the journey of the cholera pandemic in east India, many believe that this pandemic began, like the first, with outbreaks along the Ganges Delta in India. From there, the disease spread along trade routes to cover most of India. By 1828, the disease had traveled to China. Cholera was also reported in China in 1826 and 1835, and in Japan in 1831. In 1829, Iran was apparently infected with cholera from Afghanistan.

Cholera reached the southern tips of the Ural Mountains in 1829. On 26 August 1829, the first cholera case was recorded in Orenburg with reports of outbreaks in Bugulma (7 November), Buguruslan (5 December), Menzelinsk (2 January 1830), and Belebey (6 January). With 3,500 cases including 865 fatal ones in Orenburg province, the epidemic stopped by February 1830.

=== 1830s ===
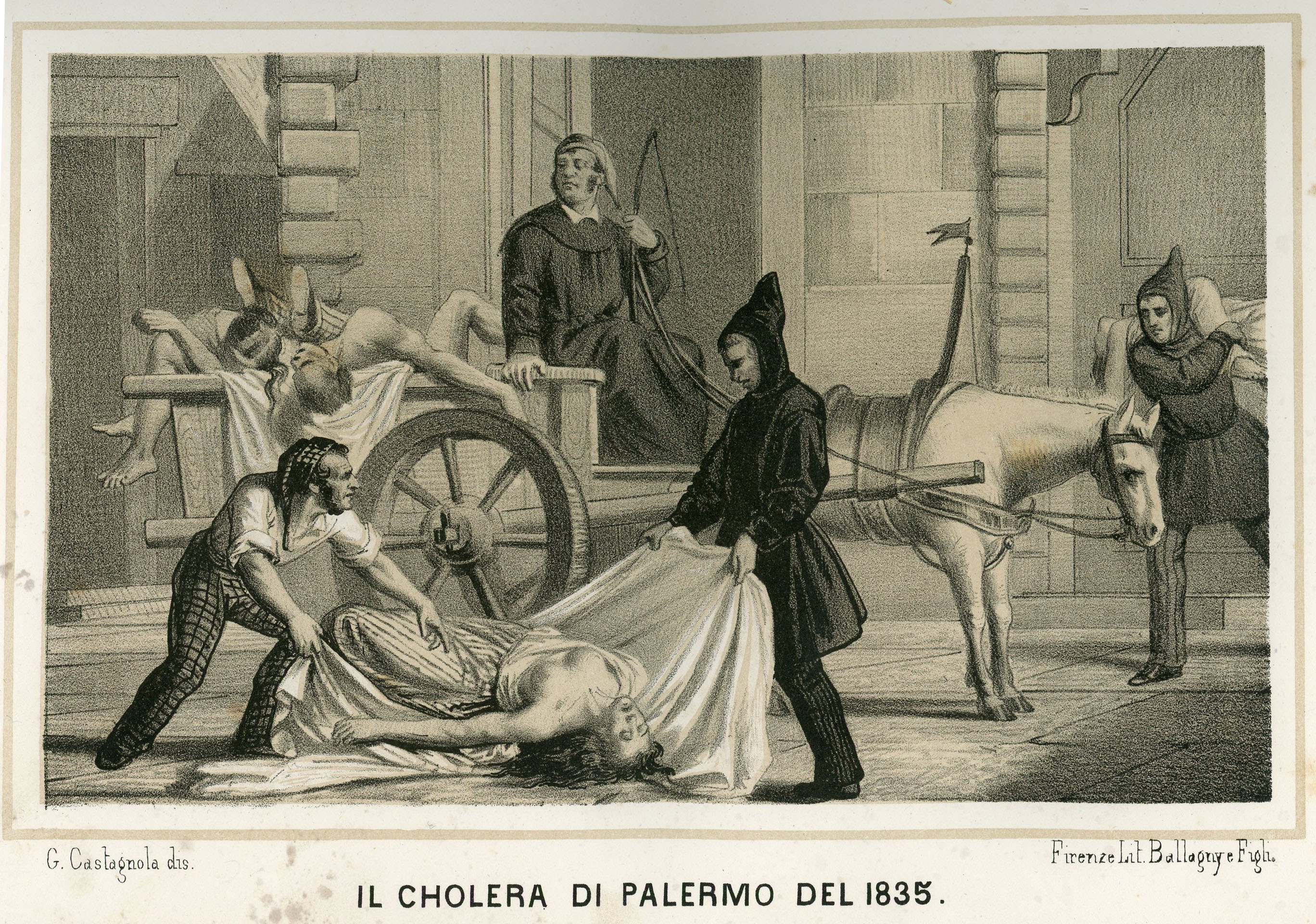
Cholera epidemic in Palermo 1835

The second cholera pandemic spread from the Russian Empire to the rest of Europe, claiming hundreds of thousands of lives. By 1831, the epidemic had infiltrated Russia's main cities and towns. Russian soldiers brought the disease to Poland in February 1831. There were reported to have been 250,000 cases of cholera and 100,000 deaths in Russia. In 1831, it is estimated that up to 100,000 deaths occurred in the Kingdom of Hungary.

The cholera epidemic struck Warsaw during the November Uprising between 16 May and 20 August 1831; 4,734 people fell ill and 2,524 died. The epidemic of cholera brought to Poland and East Prussia by Russian soldiers forced Prussian authorities to close their borders to Russian transports. There were Cholera Riots in the Russian Empire caused by the government's anticholera measures.

By early 1831, frequent reports of the spread of the pandemic in Russia prompted the British government to issue quarantine orders for ships sailing from Russia to British ports. By late summer, with the disease appearing more likely to spread to Britain, its Board of Health, in accordance with the prevailing miasma theory, issued orders recommending as a preventive the burning of "decayed articles, such as rags, cordage, papers, old clothes, hangings...filth of every description removed, clothing and furniture should be submitted to copious effusions of water, and boiled in a strong ley (lye); drains and privies thoroughly cleansed by streams of water and chloride of lime...free and continued admission of fresh air to all parts of the house and furniture should be enjoined for at least a week".

Based on the reports of two English doctors who had observed the epidemic in Saint Petersburg, the Board of Health published a detailed description of the disease's symptoms and onset:

Giddiness, sick stomach, nervous agitation, intermittent, slow, or small pulse, cramps beginning at the tops of the fingers and toes, and rapidly approaching the trunk, give the first warning. Vomiting or purging, or both these evacuations of a liquid like rice-water or whey, or barley-water, come on; the features become sharp and contracted, the eye sinks, the look is expressive of terror and wildness; the lips, face, neck, hands, and feet, and soon after the thighs, arms, and whole surface assume a leaden, blue, purple, black, or deep brown tint according to the complexion of the individual, varying in shade with the intensity of the attack. The fingers and toes are reduced in size, the skin and soft parts covering them are wrinkled, shrivelled and folded. The nails put on a bluish pearly white; the larger superficial veins are marked by flat lines of a deeper black; the pulse becomes either small as a thread, and scarcely vibrating, or else totally extinct. The skin is deadly cold and often damp, the tongue always moist, often white and loaded, but flabby and chilled like a piece of dead flesh. The voice is nearly gone; the respiration quick, irregular, and imperfectly performed. The patient speaks in a whisper. He struggles for breath, and often lays his hand on his heart to point out the seat of his distress. Sometimes there are rigid spasms of the legs, thighs, and loins. The secretion of urine is totally suspended; vomiting and purgings, which are far from being the most important or dangerous symptoms, and which in a very great number of cases of the disease, have not been profuse, or have been arrested by medicine early in the attack, succeed. It is evident that the most urgent and peculiar symptom of this disease is the sudden depression of the vital powers: proved by the diminished action of the heart, the coldness of the surface and extremities, and the stagnant state of the whole circulation.

From September 1831 to January 1832, a catastrophic cholera epidemic ravaged the lower Euphrates and Tigris regions of what is now Iraq and Iran. In Shushtar, Iran, about half of the city's inhabitants died from cholera. The Mandaean community was hit particularly hard, and all of their priests died in the plague. Yahya Bihram told Julius Heinrich Petermann that there were only 1,500 Mandaean survivors after the plague.

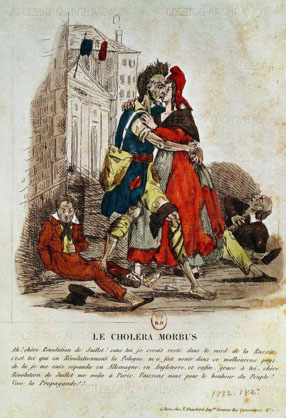
A French caricature from 1830

The epidemic reached Great Britain in October 1831, appearing in Sunderland, where it was carried by passengers on a ship from the Baltic. It also appeared in Gateshead and Newcastle. In London, the disease claimed 6,536 victims; in Paris, 20,000 died (out of a population of 650,000), with about 100,000 deaths in all of France. In 1832, the epidemic reached Quebec, Ontario, and Nova Scotia in Canada and Detroit and New York City in the United States. (Note: It first appeared in Quebec with the arrival on 28 April 1832 of the ship Constantia, which had come from Ireland.) It reached the Pacific coast of North America between 1832 and 1834. The pandemic prompted the passage of the landmark Public Health Act 1848 (11 & 12 Vict. c. 63), the Nuisances Removal and Diseases Prevention Act 1848 (11 & 12 Vict. c. 123) and the Nuisances Removal and Diseases Prevention Amendment Act 1849 (12 & 13 Vict. c. 111), in England.

In mid-1832, 57 Irish immigrants died who had been laying a stretch of railroad called Duffy's Cut, 30 miles west of Philadelphia. They had all contracted cholera.

== Causes ==
During the second pandemic, the scientific community varied in its beliefs about the causes of cholera. In France, doctors believed cholera was associated with the poverty of certain communities or poor environment. Russians believed the disease was contagious, although doctors did not understand how it spread. The United States believed that cholera was brought by recent immigrants, specifically the Irish, and epidemiologists understand they were carrying disease from British ports. Lastly, the British thought the disease might rise from divine intervention.

== Legacy ==
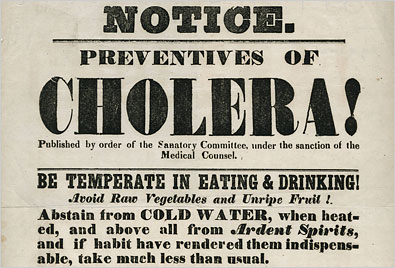
Hand bill from the New York City Board of Health, 1832: The outdated public health advice demonstrates the lack of understanding of the disease and its causes.

In response to the second cholera pandemic, the Ottoman Empire and Egypt reformed their quarantine systems, following the western Mediterranean model. In 1831, the Egyptian Quarantine Board was established. It constructed Egypt's first modern lazaretto in Alexandria in 1833. In 1831, the Ottoman government set up the first permanent quarantine complex in Istanbul. In 1838, the Ottoman government established the Supreme Council of Health, which oversaw 59 quarantines. While largely useless against cholera, these quarantines shored up the two countries' epidemiological defenses against bubonic plague.

As a result of the epidemic, the medical community developed a major advance, the intravenous saline drip. It was developed from the work of Dr. Thomas Latta of Leith, near Edinburgh. Latta established from blood studies that a saline drip greatly improved the condition of patients and saved many lives by preventing dehydration. Latta died in 1833 of tuberculosis.

A major outbreak in Sligo, Ireland, was reported on by Charlotte Thornley; her son, Bram Stoker, later incorporated some of her stories about the epidemic into his literature, such as "The Invisible Giant" in Under the Sunset. It is also believed to have inspired the plague which Count Dracula brings to the town of Whitby in his novel Dracula. Norwegian poet Henrik Wergeland wrote a stage play inspired by the pandemic, which had reached Norway. In The Indian Cholera (Den indiske Cholera, 1835), he set his play in Colonial India, lambasting the poor response to the pandemic by authorities. In the Netherlands, several Dutch poets wrote poems about the cholera, such as Adriaan van der Hoop jr. He depicted the disease in his poem as a punishment from God.

== See also ==
- History of cholera
- Tennessee cholera epidemic (1849–1850)
- Cholera epidemic in Lexington, Kentucky
