= Cholera riots =

Rioting and civil disorder linked to cholera outbreaks

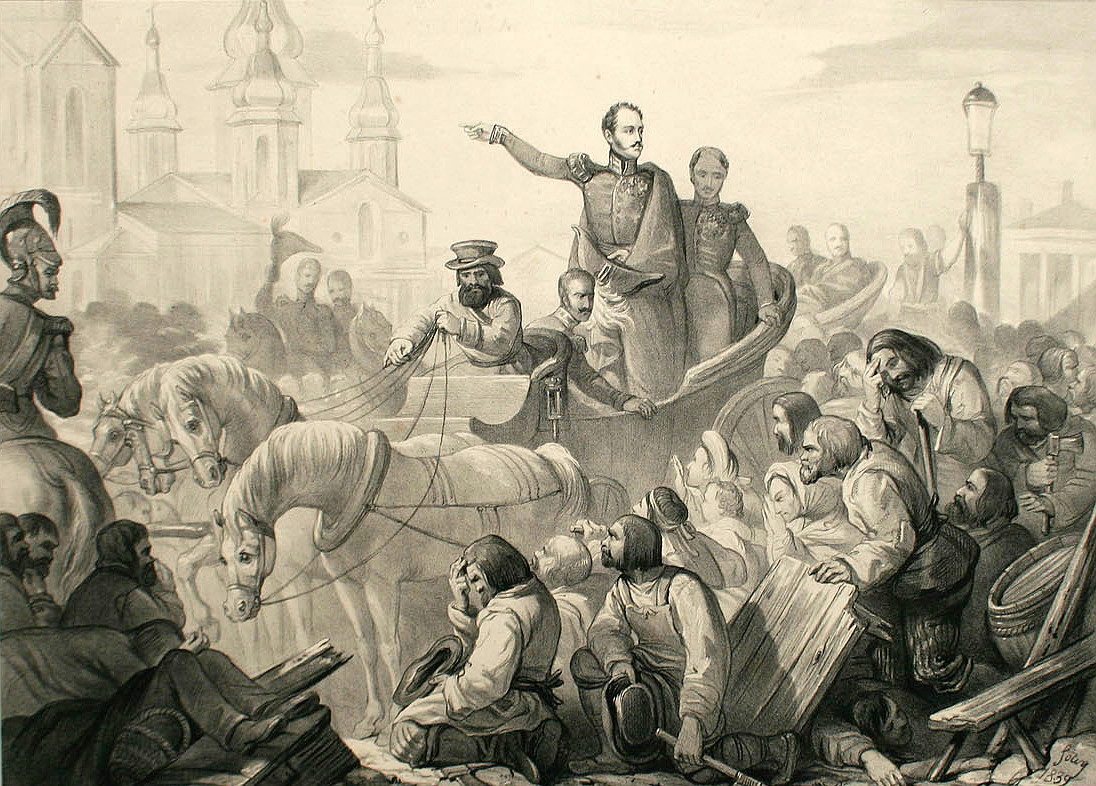
Nicholas I of Russia quelling a riot on the Sennaya Square

Cholera riots are civil disturbances associated with an outbreak or epidemic of cholera.

== In Russia ==
Cholera riots (Холерные бунты in Russian) broke out among the urban population, peasants and soldiers in 1830–1831 when the second cholera pandemic reached Russia.

The riots were caused by the anti-cholera measures, undertaken by the tsarist government, such as quarantine, armed cordons and migratory restrictions. Influenced by rumors of deliberate contamination of ordinary people by government officials and doctors, agitated mobs started raiding police departments and state hospitals, killing hated functionaries, officers, landowners and gentry. In November 1830, the citizens of Tambov attacked their governor, but they were soon suppressed by the regular army. In June 1831, there was a riot on the Sennaya Square in St.Petersburg, but the agitated workers, artisans and house-serfs were dispersed by the army, reinforced with artillery. The riots went especially out of control in Sevastopol and in military settlements of the Novgorod guberniya. The rebels established their own court, electoral committees out of soldiers and non-commissioned officers and conducted propaganda among the serfs.

Further cholera riots in 1892 were aggressively suppressed by the tsarist government.

On August 29, 1909 The New York Times reported more cholera riots in Russia.

== In Great Britain ==
Asiatic cholera reached Britain in 1831 from Russia, beginning in Sunderland and heading north to Aberdeen. A major riot took place in Aberdeen on 26 December 1831, when a dog dug up a dead body in the city. 20,000 Aberdonians (two-thirds of the city's population, although this number has been criticised as an exaggeration) protested against the medical establishment, which they believed were using the epidemic as a body-snatching scheme similar to the Burke and Hare murders of 1828:

A cry was raised of 'Burn the house; down with the burking shop'. Shavings, fir, tar, barrels and staves, were quickly procured and lighted, and within five minutes the back wall fell down with a tremendous crash. The building was completely destroyed, and had not the mob been kept in check by the sight of the military ... other acts of violence would, no doubt, have been committed.

Three men were brought to trial for riotous behaviour, and sentenced to jail in Aberdeen for twelve months, with the judge placing blame on the medical profession for its gross negligence in dealing with the disease.

The main epidemic in Britain occurred a year later. There was widespread public fear, and the political and medical response to the disease was variable and inadequate. In the summer of 1832, a series of cholera riots occurred in various towns and cities throughout Britain, frequently directed against the authorities, doctors, or both. 72 cholera riots occurred throughout the British Isles, 14 of which made reference to body-snatchers ("Burkers"). Anatomical schools were not specifically targeted, although individual physicians and hospitals were, as they saw the medical authorities as acting in coordination with the state to purposefully kill and reduce the population of the poor and "[weed] out the weak"; a doctor in Ballyshannon said that the crowds believed that "the doctors ... were to have 10 guineas a day: £5 of every one they killed; and to poison without mercy."

The city of Liverpool experienced more riots than elsewhere. Between 29 May and 10 June 1832, eight major street riots occurred, with several other minor disturbances. The object of the crowd’s anger was the local medical fraternity. The public perception was that cholera victims were being removed to the hospital to be killed by doctors in order to use them for anatomical dissection. "Bring out the Burkers" was one cry of the Liverpool mobs. This issue was of special concern to the Liverpool citizenry because in 1826, thirty-three bodies had been discovered on the Liverpool docks, about to be shipped to Scotland for dissection. Two years later a local surgeon, William Gill, was tried and found guilty of running an extensive local grave robbing system to supply corpses for his dissection rooms.

The widespread cholera rioting in Liverpool was thus as much related to local anatomical issues as it was to the national epidemic. The riots ended relatively abruptly, largely in response to an appeal by the Roman Catholic clergy read from church pulpits, and also published in the local press. In addition, a respected local doctor, James Collins, published a passionate appeal for calm. The Liverpool Cholera Riots of 1832 demonstrate the complex social responses to epidemic disease, as well as the fragile interface between the public and the medical profession.

In the same year, riots were reported in Exeter as people objected to the burial of cholera-infected bodies in local graveyards. Gravediggers were attacked. The local authorities had instituted regulations for the disposal of cholera-infected corpses and their clothes and bedding. Even the collection of clothing could result in riot or disorder as family and friends argued over the amount of compensation to be paid.

== In Hungary ==
In July 1831, a cholera uprising of 40,000 peasants broke out in the territory of Upper Hungary (today's eastern Slovakia) in more than 150 villages and small towns.

== In Germany ==
In 1893 fatal riots broke out in Hamburg, Germany during the fifth cholera pandemic, because the public objected to sanitary officers trying to enforce regulations for the prevention of spread of the disease. The crowd beat to death a sanitary officer and one of the policemen sent to protect them. Troops were called out and dispersed the crowd with fixed bayonets.

== In Zimbabwe ==
In December 2008, baton-wielding riot police broke up protests in Harare and detained dozens, as the death toll of a cholera epidemic neared 600 in Zimbabwe's worsening health and economic crises. Trade unionists protesting against limits on cash withdrawals were beaten by security forces in Harare, while police also dispersed doctors and nurses who tried to hand in a petition against the collapse of the health system.
