= Sergei Kvasov =

Russian footballer

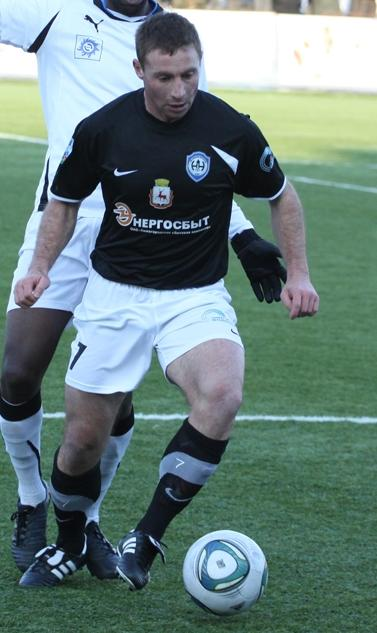
- Kvasov with Nizhny Novgorod in 2012

Personal information
- Full name: Sergei Vladimirovich Kvasov
- Date of birth: 11 June 1983 (age 43)
- Height: 1.70 m (5 ft 7 in)
- Position: Midfielder

Senior career*
Years	Team	Apps	(Gls)
2000–2002	FC Khimik Dzerzhinsk	23	(1)
2003	FC Energetik Uren	0	(0)
2006–2007	FC Khimik Dzerzhinsk (amateur)		
2008–2009	FC Khimik Dzerzhinsk	57	(10)
2010–2012	FC Nizhny Novgorod	66	(0)
2012–2016	FC Khimik Dzerzhinsk	104	(7)
- * Club domestic league appearances and goals

Sergei Vladimirovich Kvasov (Russian: Серге́й Владимирович Квасов; born 11 June 1983) is a former Russian professional football player.

== Club career ==
He played 4 seasons in the Russian Football National League for FC Nizhny Novgorod and FC Khimik Dzerzhinsk.
