= Cholera epidemic in Lexington, Kentucky =

1833 cholera outbreak in the United States

Cholera epidemic in Lexington, Kentucky was a major cholera epidemic in 1833. An estimated 502 out of 7,000 people died as a result of this epidemic and resulted in major changes in the city. Cholera is "an acute, diarrheal illness caused by infection of the intestine with the toxigenic bacterium Vibrio cholerae serogroup O1 or O139".

At the time, the city's economy revolved around the production of tobacco and hemp. Lexington's trade ships transported these agricultural products through the Ohio River, the Mississippi River, and the Atlantic Ocean. Cholera is thought to have made its way to the city through its trade system.

== Lexington, Kentucky ==
In 1833, Lexington, Kentucky was a city that had approximately 7,000 people living in it. There were farmers who owned slaves who worked as domestic servants and artisans. The major crops that Lexington produced were tobacco and hemp. These crops were distributed across the United States and the globe by ships. Lexington used the Ohio River ports to get their trade ships from Lexington to the Mississippi River and then eventually the Atlantic Ocean where their goods could be transported to Europe. This trade system is hypothesized to be the main reason that the cholera epidemic made its way to the United States and to different states such as Ohio and Kentucky. This illness has sub-Asian roots and due to the trading system throughout the globe, the illness made its way to the United States and eventually to Lexington, Kentucky.

== Causes ==
Cholera is "caused by drinking water or eating food contaminated with the cholera bacterium. In an epidemic, the source of the contamination is usually the feces of an infected person that contaminates water and/or food. The disease can spread rapidly in areas with inadequate treatment of sewage and drinking water". This is an extremely important factor of how the cholera epidemic was able to spread throughout the city of Lexington. There were 7,000 people living in this city and clean water was not a main priority in the 19th century. There were usually wells that farmers and slaves got their water from. These wells were shared by many which made the cholera epidemic nearly impossible to prevent.
