= Constantia (1816 ship) =

History

United Kingdom
- Name: Constantia
- Launched: 1816, Swansea
- Fate: Last listed in 1846

General characteristics
- Tons burthen: 217 (bm)

Constantia was launched at Swansea in 1816. She sailed as a coaster, and across the Atlantic, making at least two voyages bringing immigrants to Canada. In April 1832, she was the first of four ships that arrived at Quebec within a month with passengers having died of cholera. She and the vessels that followed her introduced the 1826–1837 cholera pandemic to North America as it spread from Quebec to the rest of Canada and down to the United States. She was last listed in 1848.

== Career ==
Constantia first appeared in Lloyd's Register (LR) in 1816.

Year	Master	Owner	Trade	Source
1816	W.Moyes	Captain & Co.	Cork–Newport	LR
1818	W.Moyes	Captain & Co.	London–Waterford; Bristol–Petersburg	LR

In 1819 Constantia, Moyne, master, brought 90 immigrants from Waterford to Quebec, arriving on 15 August. (Note: A biography of Allen Baker contains an extract from the diaries of his father describing the voyage from County Wexford to Canada. The Bakers were Quakers who migrated to Canada in search of religious freedom.)

Year	Master	Owner	Trade	Source & notes
1821	W.Moyes	Eaton & Co.	Liverpool–Waterford	LR
1823	W.Moyse	Moyse	London coaster	LR
1826	W.Moyes	Captain & Co.	London–Petersburg	LR
1827	W.Moyes	Captain & Co.	Warterford–America	LR
1830	W.Moyes	Captain & Co.	Greenock–Dublin	LR; damages repaired 1829
1832	W.Moyes	Captain & Co.	Falmouth–London	LR; damages repaired 1829

In autumn 1831 the Government of Quebec established a quarantine station on Grosse-Île, Quebec in response to warnings about cholera from the Colonial Office in London. It also established a sanitary commission in February 1832, specifically to deal with cholera. A few months later it established a Board of Health.

On 28 April 1732, Constantia arrived from Limerick. She had embarked 170 migrants, 29 of whom had died on the voyage. (Note: A report from Montreal dated 10 June, reported 22 deaths: three of Asiatic cholera (last 10 May), two of typhus, eight of common cholera (last case 20 May), and nine of other diseases. The ship Elizabeth and Sarah had lost 22 people: two to Asiatic cholera, 11 to common cholera (the last on 5 June), five of diarrhoea, one of infirmity, and three children. At the time, European physicians called "cholera" any gastrointestinal upset that resulted in yellow diarrhea. It was only in the 1830s that this became known as "cholera morbidus"; the new disease was referred to as "Asiatic cholera" because of its origin in the East Indies.) Robert arrived on 14 May from Cork; she had had 10 deaths on board. On 28 May, Elizabeth arrived from Dublin; she had embarked 200 migrants and had 17 or 20 deaths on board. Lastly, Carrick arrived on 3 June from Dublin; she had embarked 145 migrants and had 42 deaths on board. (Note: Some sources state that a fifth vessel arrived at Quebec with cholera on board. They report that Brubus arrived on May 18 from Liverpool; she had had 81 deaths on board. On 18 May 1832, Brutus, J. Neilson, master, sailed from Liverpool for Quebec with 330 passengers and 19 crewmen. Captain Neilson turned around after crew started to come down with the disease on 3 June. She arrived back in the Mersey on 13 June. In her 26 days at sea she had suffered 117 cases of illness, comprising 83 deaths and 36 recoveries. The authorities immediately placed the survivors on a quarantine ship.)

There was little knowledge of the disease or how it spread, and the quarantine at Grosse-Île was minimal. Soiled clothing and bedding was not washed, and there was no disinfection. Any passenger who did not exhibit symptoms was permitted to go leave. Between 2 and 5 June, no fewer than 750 passengers went on to Québec and Montréal. On 7 June, Voyageur, a steam boat, took a number of immigrants from Grosse Île to Québec and Montréal. Cholera appeared in Québec on 8 June, and in Montréal on 10 June, and many accounts credit Voyager with the dissemination. However, cases had been sent to those cities before that. The disease spread along Lake Ontario, and down Lake Champlain to Albany, and New York. Those places that did not permit passengers to land from steamboats escaped the disease.

Year	Master	Owner	Trade	Source & notes
1835	J.Rees; C.Ellis	Strangeman	Milford coaster	LR; thorough repairs 1835; homeport Waterford
1839	C.Ellis; T.Cass	Strangeman; Douthwaite	Milford coaster Shields–London	LR; large repair 1835 & small repair 1839; homeport Waterford
1840	T.Cass	Douthwaite	Shields–London; Yarmouth–Baltic	LR; large repair 1835, small repair 1839 & 1840; homeport Waterford
1842		Boutland	Newcastle	LR; thorough repair 1842; homeport Newcastle
1844	Hutchinson	Boutland; Noble & Co.	Newcastle; Shields–Baltic	LR; through repair 1842 & large repair 1844, homeport Newcastle
1846	Hutchinson; J.Sands	Noble & Co.	Shields–Baltic	LR; through repair 1842 & large repair 1844, homeport Newcastle
1848	J.Sands	Noble & Co.		
