= Saviour Church on Sennaya Square =

Church building in Saint Petersburg, Russia

Coordinates: 59°55′38.14″N 30°19′14.44″E

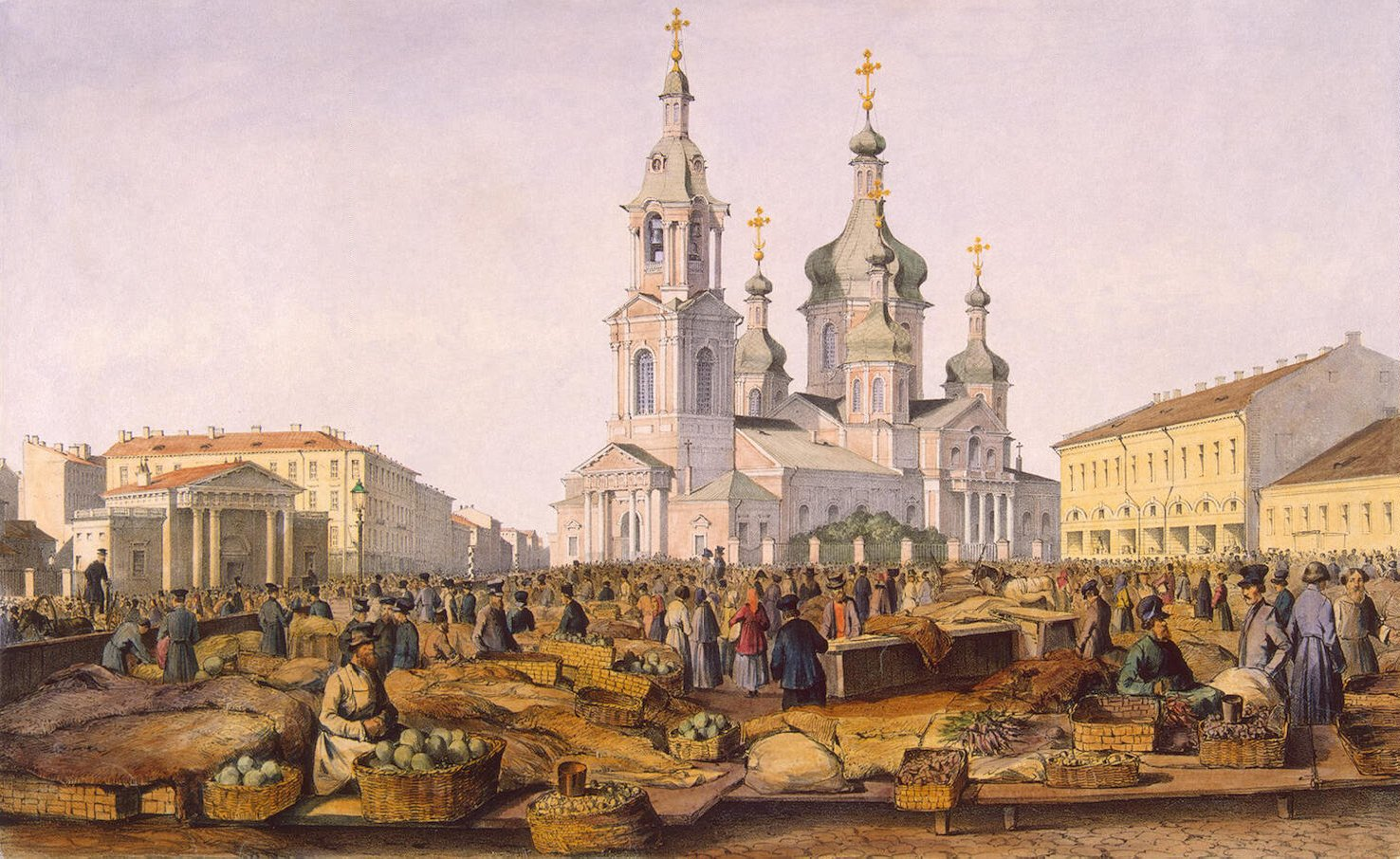
Spasa-na-Sennoy Church and the Hay Market in 1841

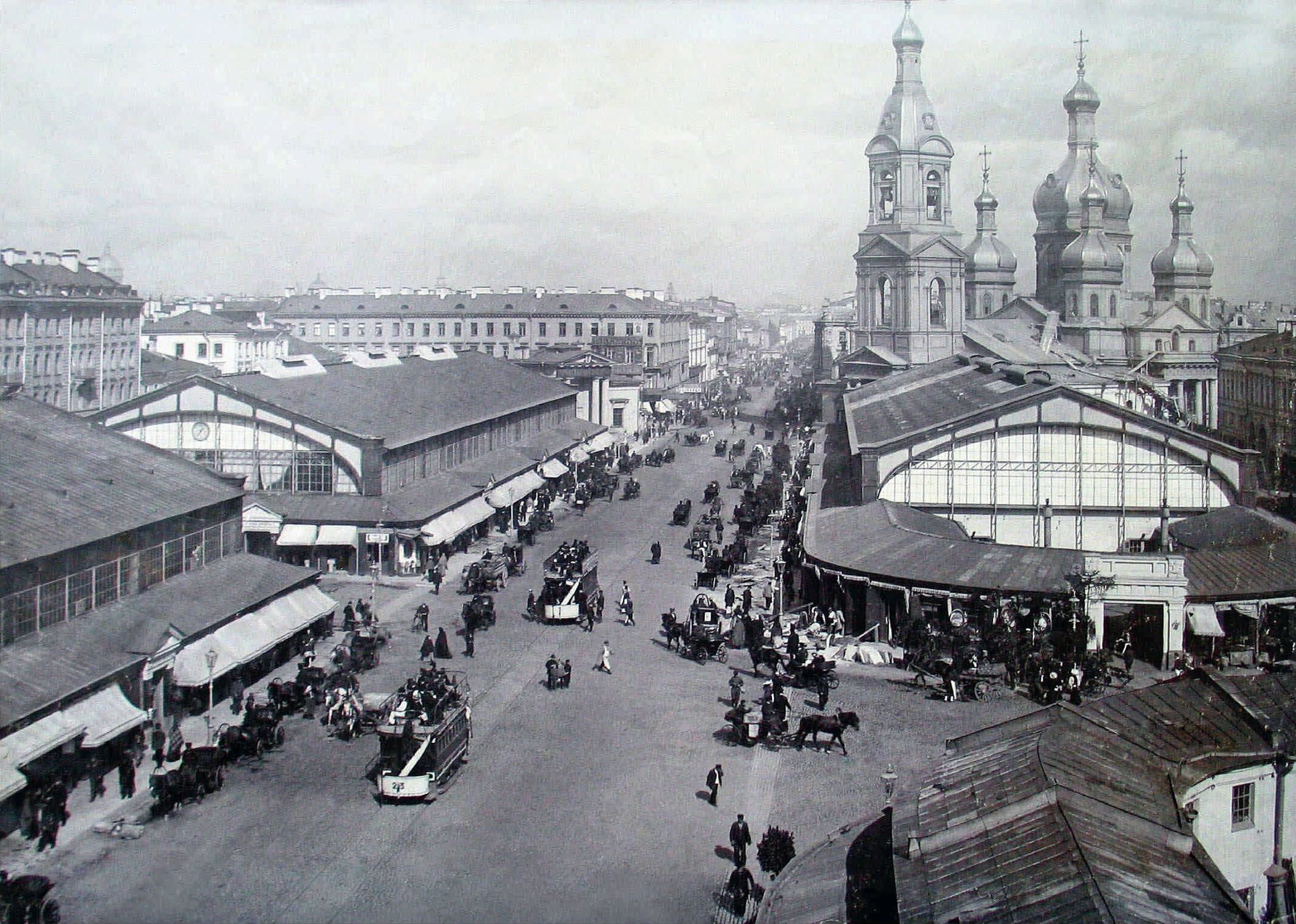
Sennaya Square at the beginning of the XX century; the church was blown up by the Soviet regime in 1961, and the market has since been disassembled

The Assumption Church, commonly known as the Saviour Church, located on Sennaya Square in St. Petersburg, Russia, was a Late Baroque penticupolar church sponsored by Orthodox merchants trading at the nearby Sennaya Square market.

The church originated as a wooden building transferred across the Neva from the northern part of the city. It was rebuilt in stone in the 1750s to a Rastrelliesque design attributed to Andrey Kvasov and was slightly modified on several occasions, most importantly by Luigi Rusca in 1817. The church boasted a high belfry of three storeys, a gilded icon screen, and many valuable items. Its parish was one of the richest in the city.

The large building with the distinctive dark-green jug-like domes used to dominate the surrounding district. It gave its name to Spassky Island (the central parcel of the downtown wedged between the Fontanka, Moika, Griboyedov and Kryukov canals) and Spasskaya metro station.

The building survived the Joseph Stalin period intact and was even elevated by the Living Church to a cathedral status (in 1923) but was blown up at the height of Nikita Khrushchev's anti-religious campaign in 1961. A metro vestibule that was to replace it stands slightly to the north. The site of the church has been marked by a small chapel since 2003.

== Sources ==
- Isachenko, Valeriy (2010). Зодчие Санкт-Петербурга XVIII – XX веков [Architects of St Petersburg in XVIII – XX Centuries] (in Russian). Moscow: Tsentrpoligraph. ISBN 978-5-227-02220-2.
