= Sennaya Square =

City square in Central Saint Petersburg, Russia

Coordinates: 59.927°N 30.318°E

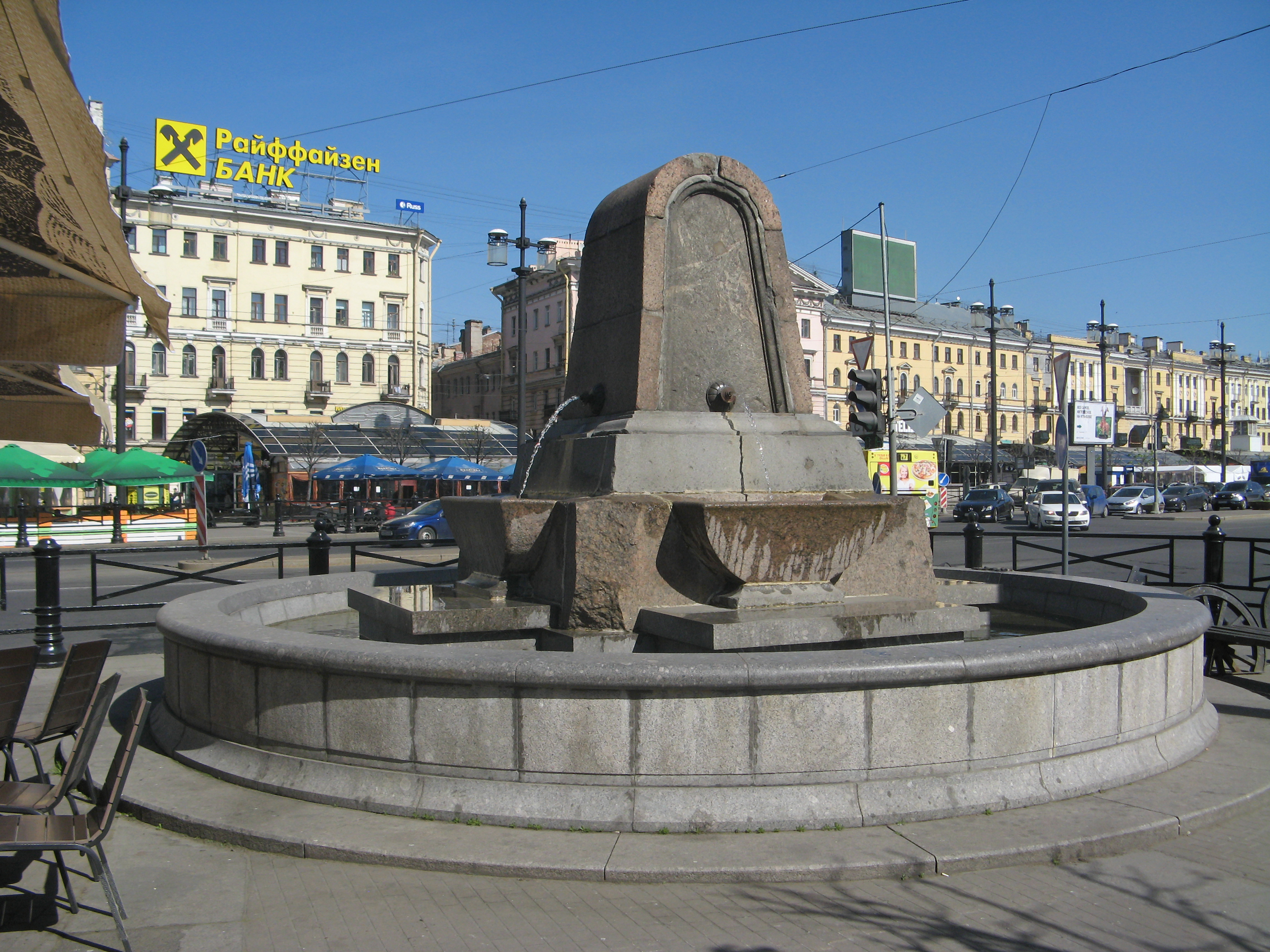
Neptune fountain at Sennaya Square

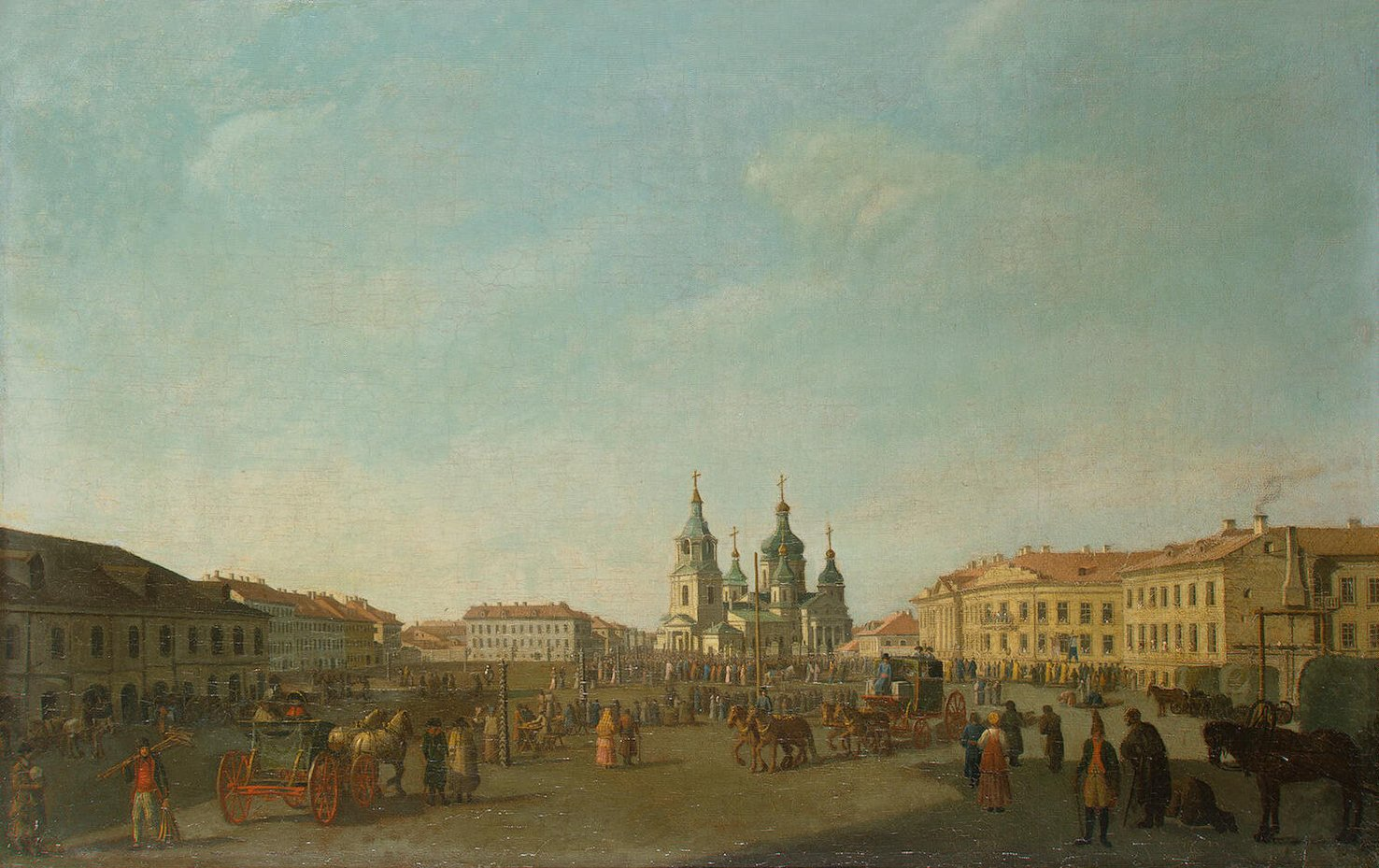
Vintage view of Sennaya Square by Benjamin Patersen (1748/50 to 1814/15)

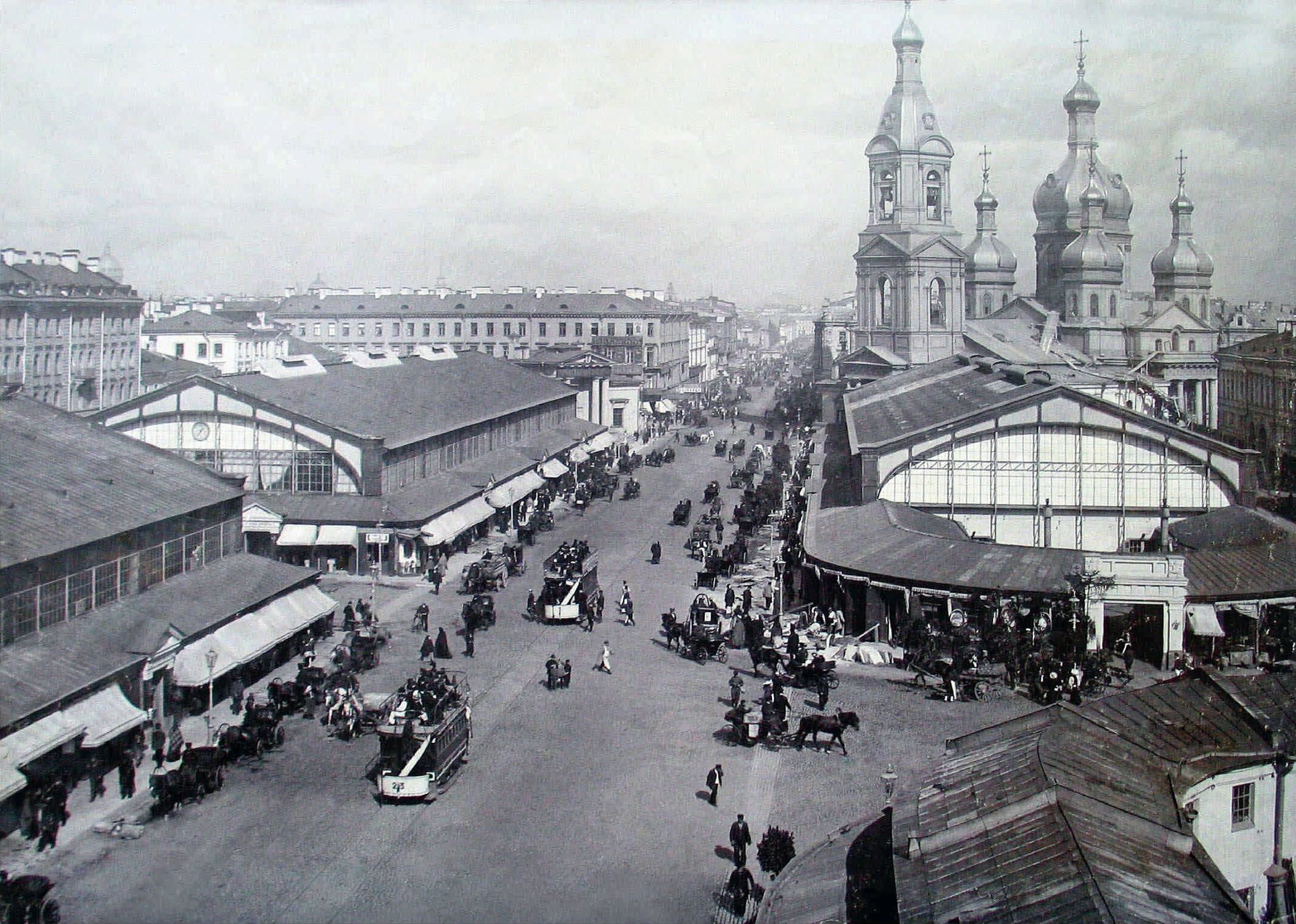
Sennaya Square in the early 20th century; the church was blown up by the Soviet regime in 1961, and the market has since been disassembled

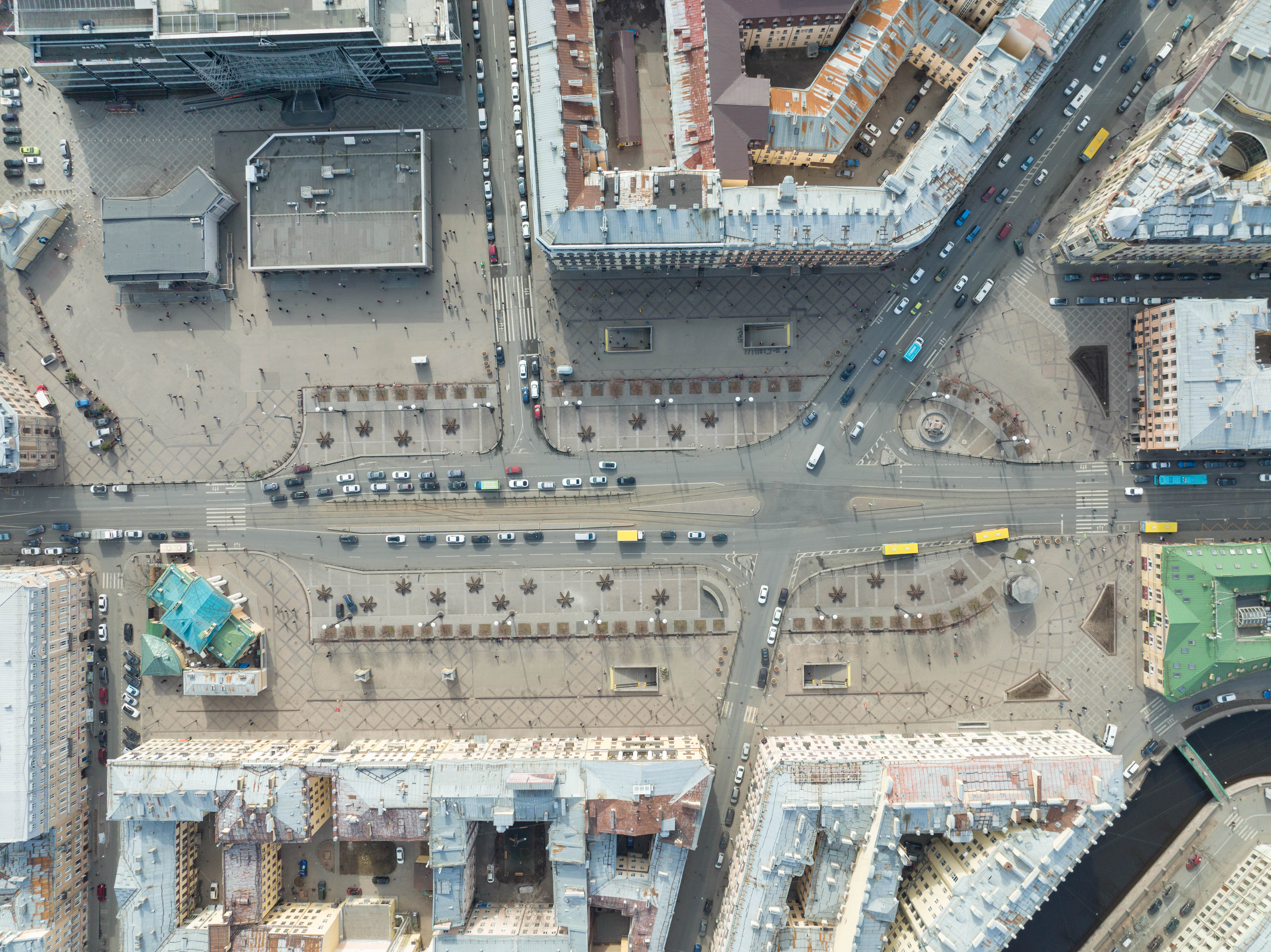
Aerial view of Sennaya Square in 2022, the guardhouse on Sennaya Square in the bottom left corner

Sennaya Square or Sennaya Ploshchad (Russian: Сенна́я пло́щадь, IPA: [sʲɪˈnːajə ˈploɕːɪtʲ], lit. 'Hay Square') is a large city square in Central Saint Petersburg, located at the crossing of Sadovaya Street and Moskovsky Prospekt (formerly Zabalkansky Prospekt).

== History ==
The square was established in 1737 as a market where hay, firewood and cattle were sold. It was built under the extension of the Garden Street, and grew quickly, becoming the cheapest and the most active market in Saint Petersburg. The Hay Market was a place where merchants and farmers could trade. It was there that malefactors were flogged before a large concourse of people.

In 1753, local merchants commissioned the building of the Church of the Assumption of the Mother of God in a sumptuous Baroque style. In the middle of the square is a former guardhouse (1818–20). Cholera riots took place in the square in 1831. The surrounding district was known for its infamous slums, which provide the setting for Fedor Dostoevsky's novel Crime and Punishment.

In 1952, Joseph Stalin renamed the square Ploshchad Mira. In 1961, at the height of Nikita Khrushchev's anti-religious campaign, he had the church demolished; a chapel now marks the site. In 1992, the square's original name was restored.

Since 2003, there was 18 meter high "Peace Tower", a gift of France for the tercentenary of St. Petersburg. It was dismantled during the heatwave of 2010. The column featured the word "peace" written in 49 languages.

Three metro stations serve the square; its namesake Sennaya Ploshchad, Sadovaya (Garden Street) and Spasskaya. It is also a bus and marshrutka station. It used to have regular tram transportation until 2010, a fragment of the tram rails having been preserved as a historical mark.

== Streets entering the square ==
- Sadovaya Street
- Yefimov Street
- Moskovsky Avenue
- Brinko Lane
- Grivtsov Lane
- Spassky Lane
- ru:набережная канала Грибоедова (Griboyedov Canal embankment)

== See also ==
- List of squares in Saint Petersburg

== Sources ==
- Isachenko, Valeriy (2010). Зодчие Санкт-Петербурга XVIII – XX веков [Architects of St Petersburg in XVIII – XX Centuries] (in Russian). Moscow: Tsentrpoligraph. ISBN 978-5-227-02220-2.
