= Emperor Alexander (1814 Sunderland ship) =

History

United Kingdom
- Name: Emperor Alexander
- Builder: Sunderland
- Launched: 1814
- Fate: Wrecked and abandoned 22 November 1832

General characteristics
- Tons burthen: 236 (bm)
- Length: 83 ft 11 in (25.58 m)
- Beam: 25 ft 8 in (7.82 m)

Emperor Alexander was launched at Sunderland in 1814. She traded widely during which time she suffered some misfortunes, being plundered once and grounding once. In 1823 she carried settlers from Tobermory, Mull, to Quebec. She was wrecked in November 1832.

== Career ==
On 22 May 1816, Emperor Alexander, of Dundee, arrived at Charleston. On 10 May she was off Bermuda when she encountered a man-of-war under Spanish colours. The Spanish vessel plundered Emperor Alexander before releasing her. She arrived back in the Clyde on 12 August.

On 2 April 1818 Emperor Alexander, Watt, master, arrived at Charleston. On 7 March at 31°46′N 50°00′W a schooner came up to her and fired a shot across her bow. The schooner neither showed her colours nor boarded. After having detained Emperor Alexander, the schooner sailed off.

Emperor Alexander first appeared in Lloyd's Register (LR) in 1818 with Watt, master, J.&E.Catto, owners, and trade London–New Providence, changing to Liverpool–Petersburg. On her voyage to Petersburg she grounded on 7 July 1818 on the Swine Bottoms. She was gotten off with the assistance of the diving company and proceeded to Landskrona to repair.

Year	Master	Owner	Trade	Source
1820	A.Watt	J.&E. Catto	Liverpool–Honduras	LR

On 23 July 1823 Emperor Alexander, Watt, master, sailed from Tobermory. She arrived at Quebec on 14 October with 49, or 160 settlers. (Note: A (partial?) list of passengers is available.) She also brought with her the remainder of the stores and cargo of Constantia which had wrecked upon Cape Breton. The decline of kelp production in the Western Islands (Outer Hebrides) in the 1820s led many of their inhabitants to migrate to Cape Breton.

Year	Master	Owner	Trade	Source
1825	A.Watt	Catto & Co.	Belfast–St John	LR
1830	A.Watt; M'Kennan	Catto & Co.	Belfast–St John	LR

== Fate ==
Emperor Alexander was wrecked on the Arklow Bank, in the Irish Sea on 22 November 1832. Her crew were rescued. She was on a voyage from Quebec City to Dublin.

On 24 November the coastguard station at Greystones saw a dismasted brig floating on her side, some three leagues away. The station chief officer launched his galley in heavy seas to go to the rescue. When the galley reached the wreck they found that she was Emperor Alexander, of Aberdeen, carrying lumber, and that there was no one aboard. At the about the same time two pilot skiffs from Dublin also arrived. Then about two hours later Lieutenant Tandy of the Royal Navy's Bray, County Wicklow, station arrived on the scene too. Together, they were able to bring the wreck into Kingstown, County Dublin on 2 December.

The 1833 issue of the Register of Shipping (RS) carried the annotation "LOST" by her name.
