= Nikolay Krasnov (architect) =

Russian Serbian architect and painter (1864–1939)

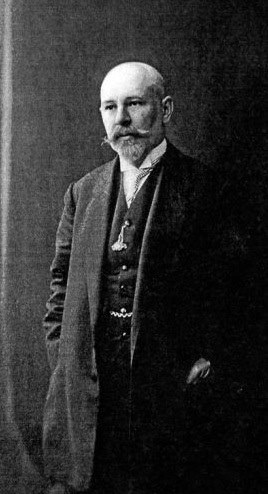
- Born: November 23, 1864; Khonyátino village, now Stupinsky District, Moscow Oblast
- Died: December 8, 1939 (aged 75); Belgrade, Kingdom of Yugoslavia
- Other names: Николай Петрович Краснов
- Occupation: architect
- Years active: 1883–1939
- Known for: Livadia Palace
- Notable work: Kokkoz Jami Mosque, Dulber imperial residence, Yusupov Palace (Crimea), St. Alexander Nevsky Cathedral (Yalta), Ministry of Foreign Affairs Building (Belgrade), Government Building (Belgrade), King Alexander Bridge

Nikolay Petrovich Krasnov (Russian: Николай Петрович Краснов; 23 November 1864 – 8 December 1939) was a Russian and Serbian architect and painter, who served as chief architect of Yalta, Crimea, between 1887 and 1899. From 1922 he lived and worked in the Kingdom of Yugoslavia, and was a key figure in the architectural development of Belgrade.

== Life and career ==
=== Early life and education ===
Krasnov started attending the Moscow School of Painting, Sculpture and Architecture in 1876, aged 12. As a young artist he received patronage from Sergey Tretyakov, brother of the founder of Moscow's Tretyakov Gallery, and entrepreneur Petar Gubonyin.

=== 1887–1899: Chief Architect of Yalta ===
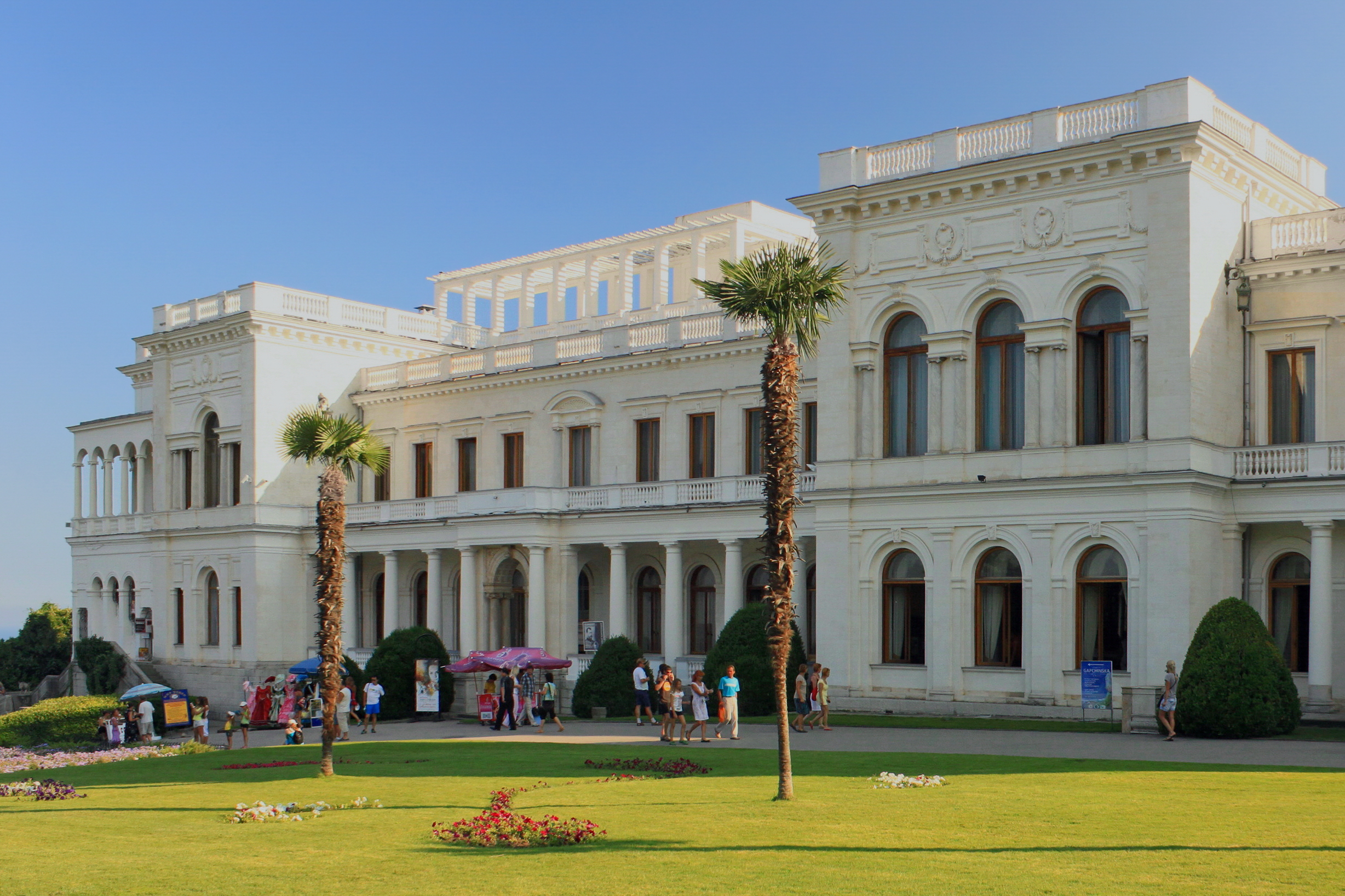
Livadia Palace, Yalta 1909

In 1887 Krasnov took up the post of Chief Architect in Yalta, for which he was paid 900 roubles per year. He had a contract for 24 years, of which he served 12. Taking up the post at the age of 23, Krasnov had large responsibility for the rapid growth of the city at the time. He started by expanding the promenade, which by 1913 would become the main street of the city, before developing and adopting a new city plan in 1889. This included a new sewer system, new planning regulations including limits to the width of streets and height of buildings, the building of new streets, and prevention of unregulated construction in the city. The plan also included a school and children's hospital, and the construction of the Pushkin Boulevard. Two concrete bridges were built over the river, and the embankment strengthened. Many streets were also renamed as part of this plan.

=== 1899–1917: Private practice in Yalta ===
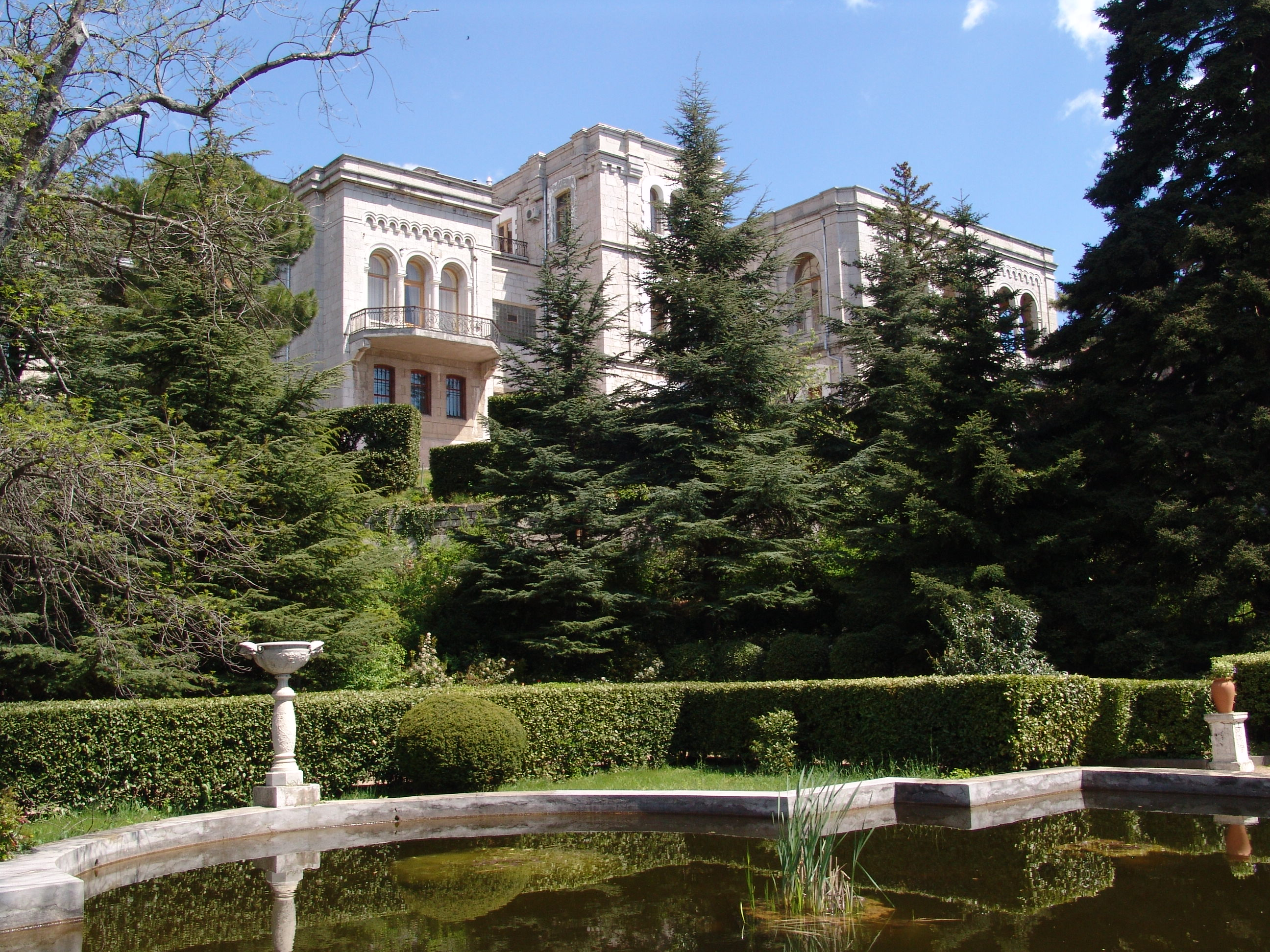
Yusupov Palace, Koreiz 1909

Krasnov also ran a private practice in Yalta until 1911. Among his most famous work is the Livadia Palace, later the location of the 1945 Yalta Conference. This was built on the Yalta estate of Tsar Nicholas II, on the site of a previous palace demolished in 1904. Krasnov worked on the designs through 1909 and they were commissioned in 23 April 1910, and built over the subsequent 17 months.

Krasnov designed over 60 buildings in Crimea in total, blending a modernist style with the traditions of the local architecture. Other notable examples include the Dulber Palace in Koreiz (built 1895-97), Alexander Nevsky Cathedral in Yalta (1902), Yusupov Palace in Koreiz (1909), and Kokkoz Jami Mosque in Sokolyne (1910). In 1913, he presented a collection of illustrations he had produced of his works to the Saint Petersburg Academy of Arts, where he held the title of academician.

=== 1919–1922: Exile in Malta ===
An opponent of the Russian Revolution, Krasnov left Yalta with his family in 1919 for Malta, alongside the Dowager Empress Marie Feodorovna, sister of Queen Alexandra, and over 600 members of the Russian aristocracy. Nikolay was in a group housed in the empty Villa St Ignatius, which had been a Jesuit college and then a hospital during World War I. To earn money, Nikolay painted many scenes of Malta, signing his paintings as N Krasnoff. He is known as Nicholas Krasnoff in Malta. In May 2016 MaltaPost issued a commemorative set of stamps in his honour.

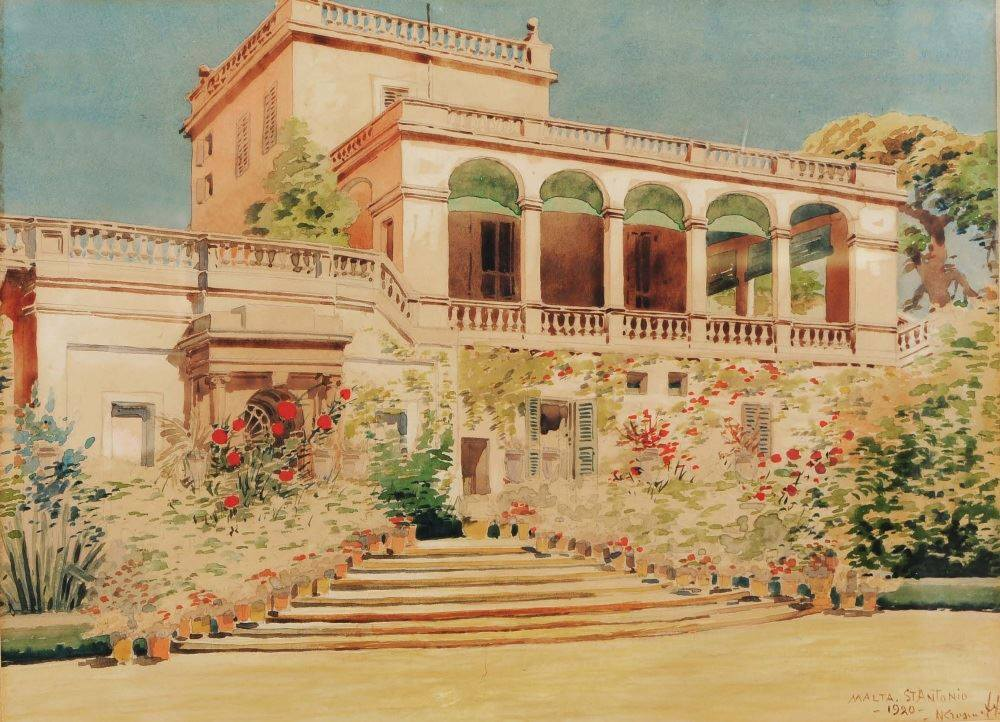
San Anton Palace

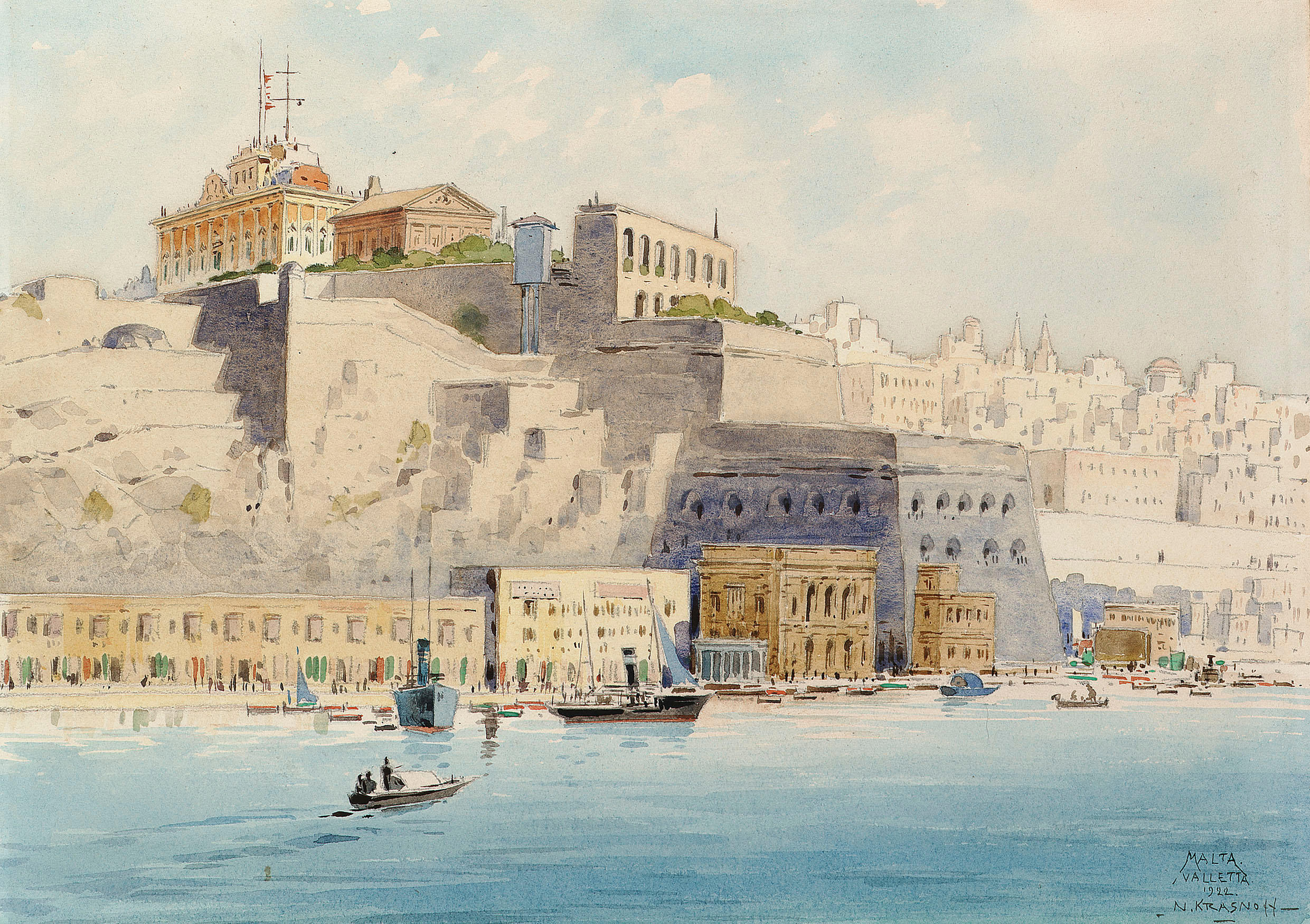
View of Valletta from Grand Harbour

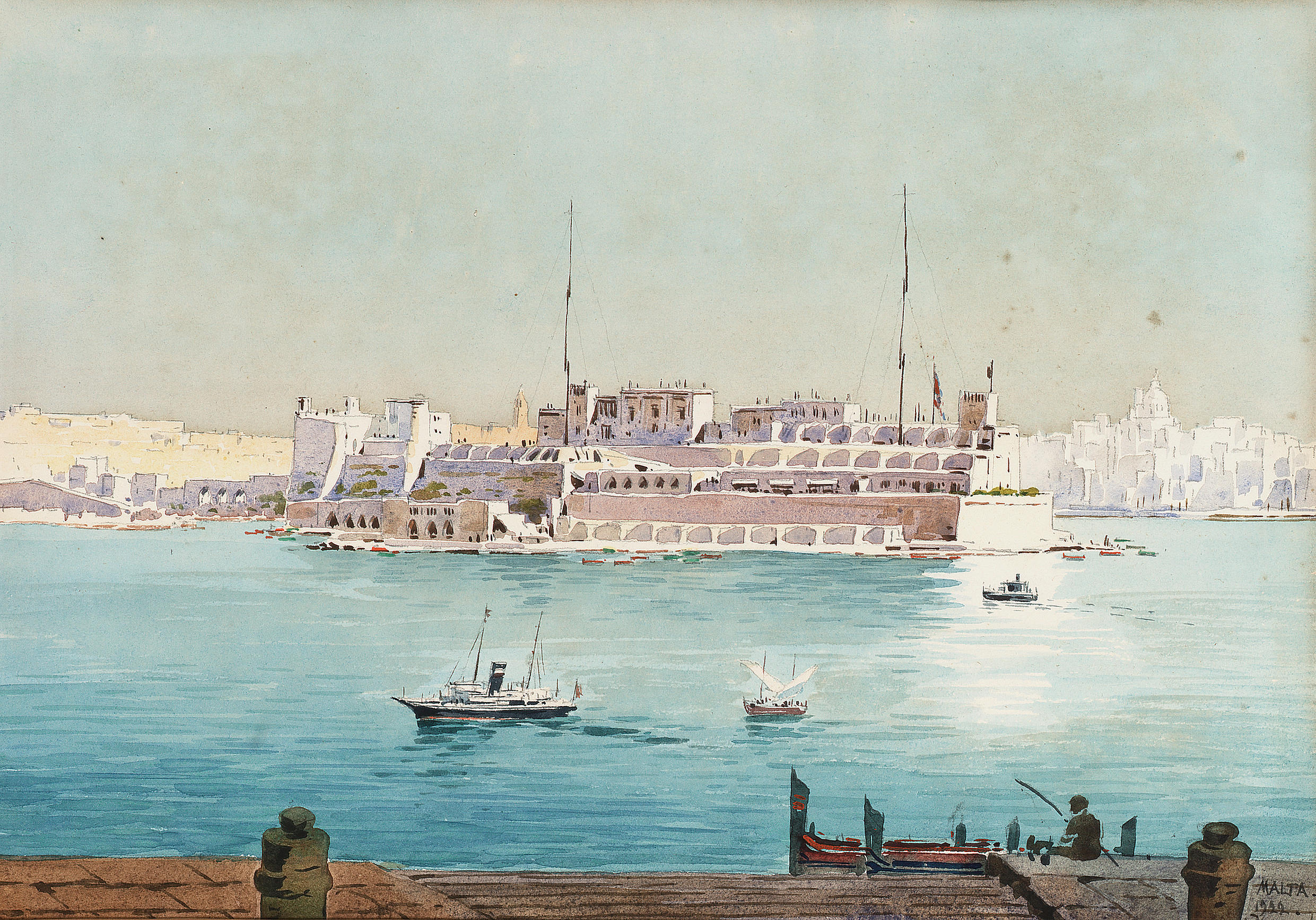
Fort St. Angelo

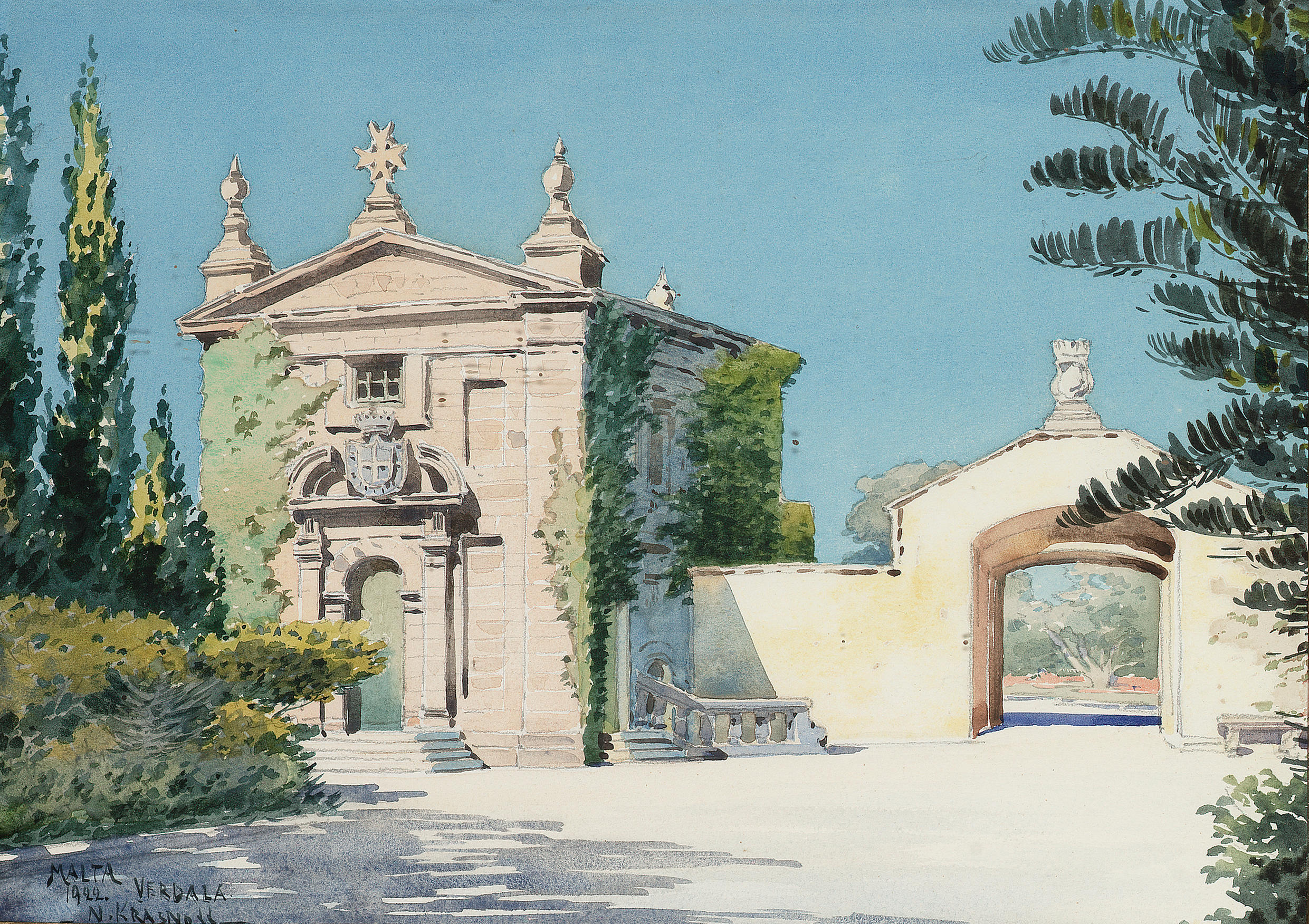
Verdala Palace Chapel

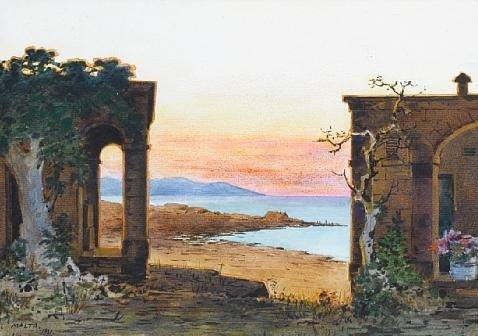
Maltese coast at dusk

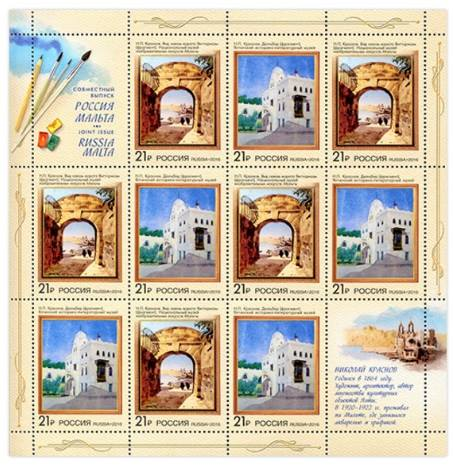
Russian stamps

=== 1922–1939: Work in Belgrade ===
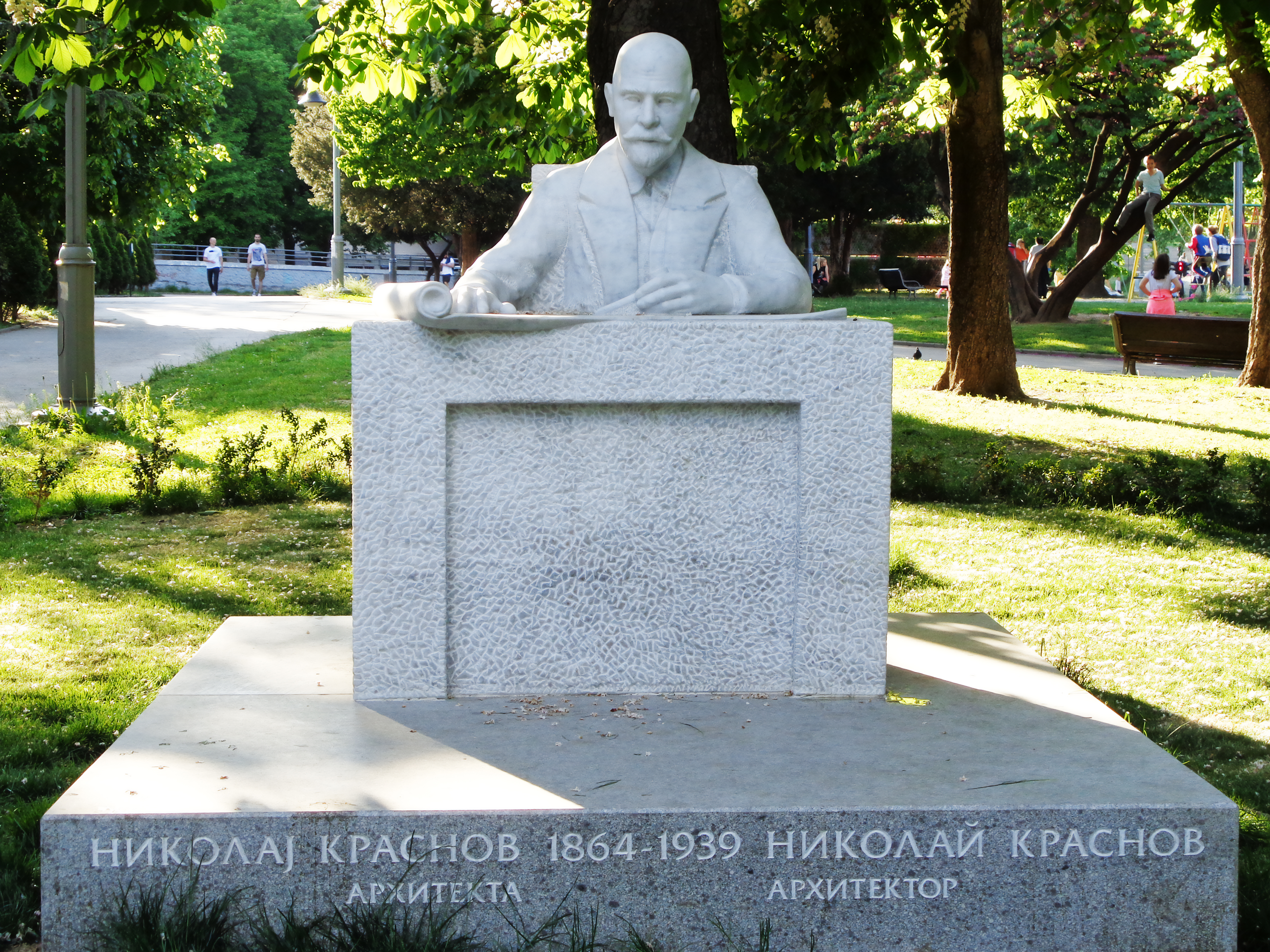
Monument to Nikolay Krasnov in Belgrade

In 1922 Krasnov and his wife moved to Belgrade, then part of the Kingdom of Yugoslavia. He was one of around 90,000 Russian emigrés in Yugoslavia at the time, and one of many Russian architects and civil engineers that would have a large impact on the country over the next two decades. In Belgrade he became head of the Department of Monumental Architectural Developments and Monuments, part of the Serbian Ministry of Housing and Building. His building designs in Serbia number around 60, and were created under the name Nikola Krasnov, as a mark of respect to his adopted homeland.

His key works in Belgrade include: the Ministry of Foreign Affairs Building (1923) which bears a memorial plaque to Krasnov; the Serbian National Archives Building (1928); and the Government Building (built 1926–29). These academicist buildings were large and imposing, and designed to represent the strength of Yugoslavian statehood. However, Krasnov also created buildings of various other styles, including the renovation of the medieval Ružica Church in 1925. He also created the artistic interiors for St. George's Church royal mausoleum in Topola, the villa of the Old Palace in Belgrade, and the House of the National Assembly (completed in 1936).

He died in Belgrade on 8 December 1939, and is buried in the Russian section of the New Cemetery in Belgrade.

In 2016 a street in Belgrade was renamed in his honour.

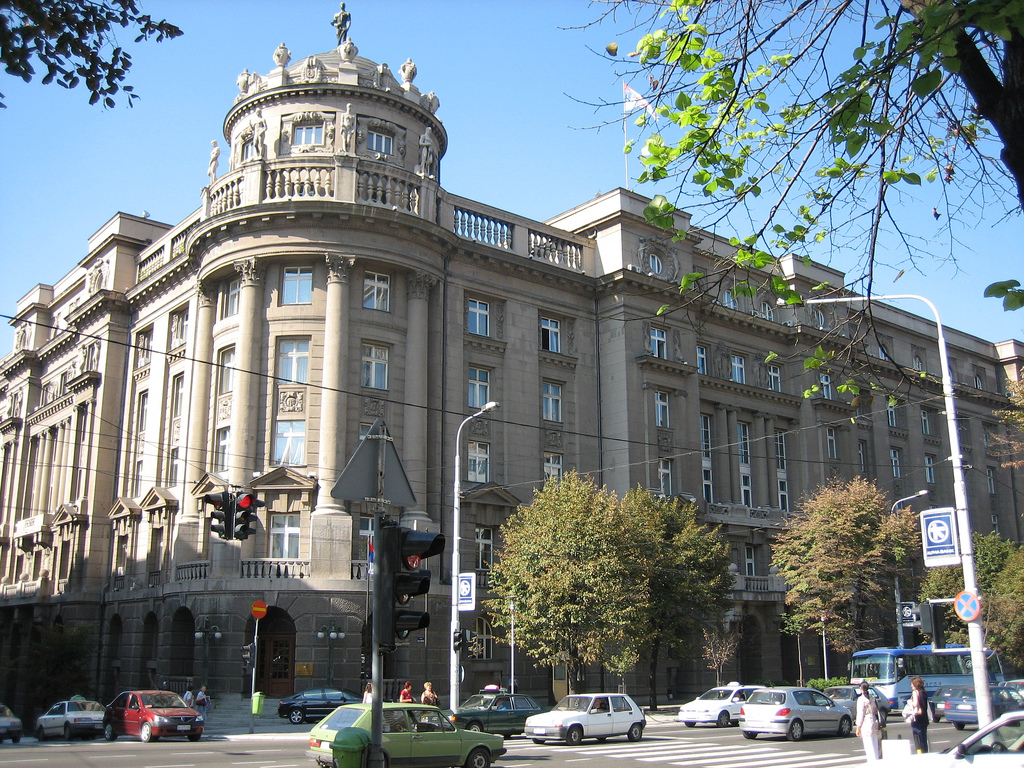
Ministry of Foreign Affairs Building, Belgrade, 1923

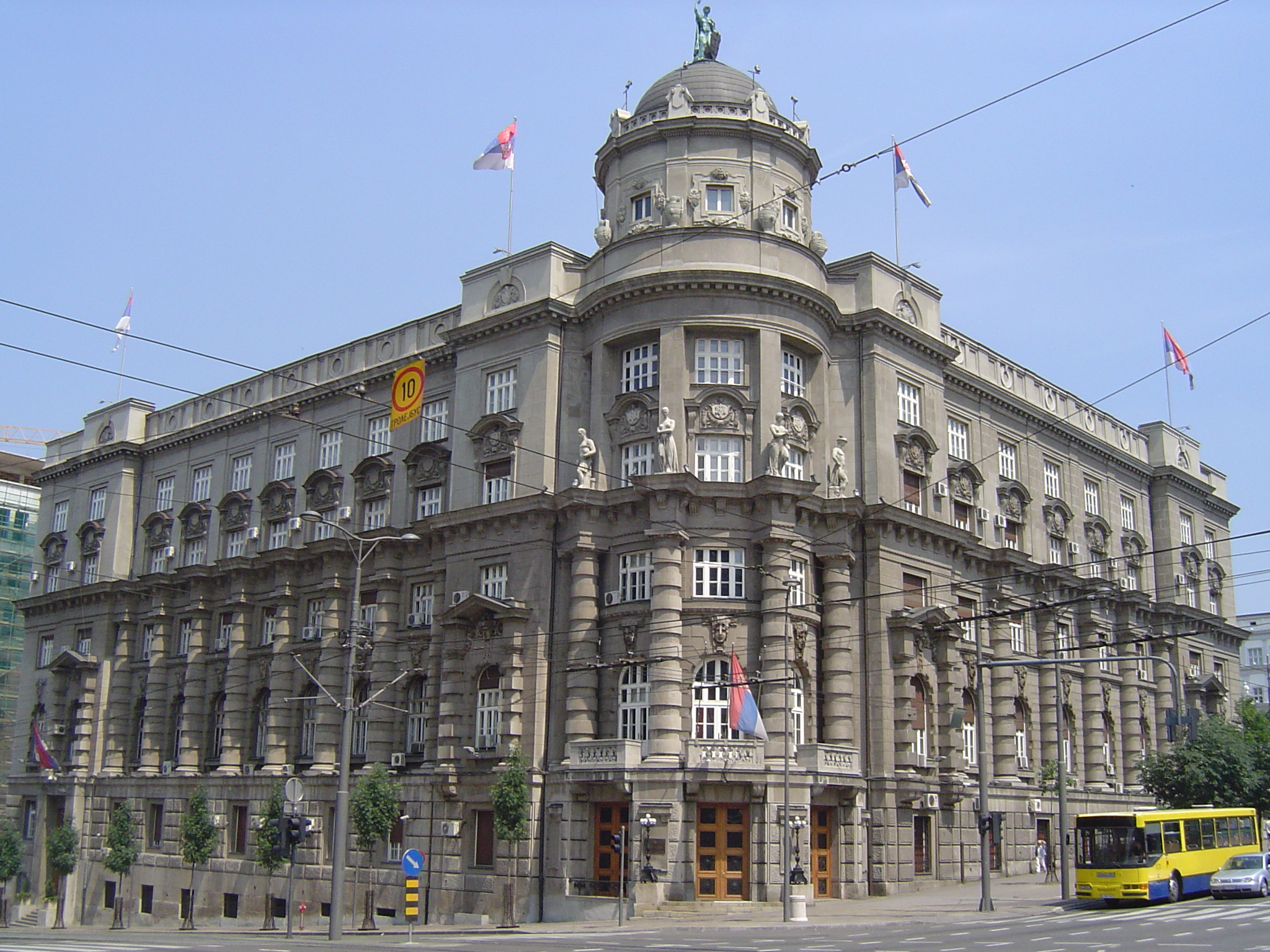
Government Building, Belgrade, 1926–28

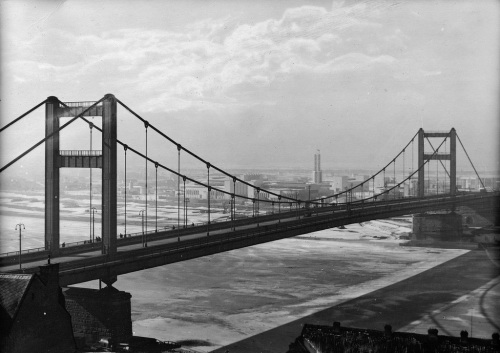
King Alexander Bridge, Belgrade, 1934

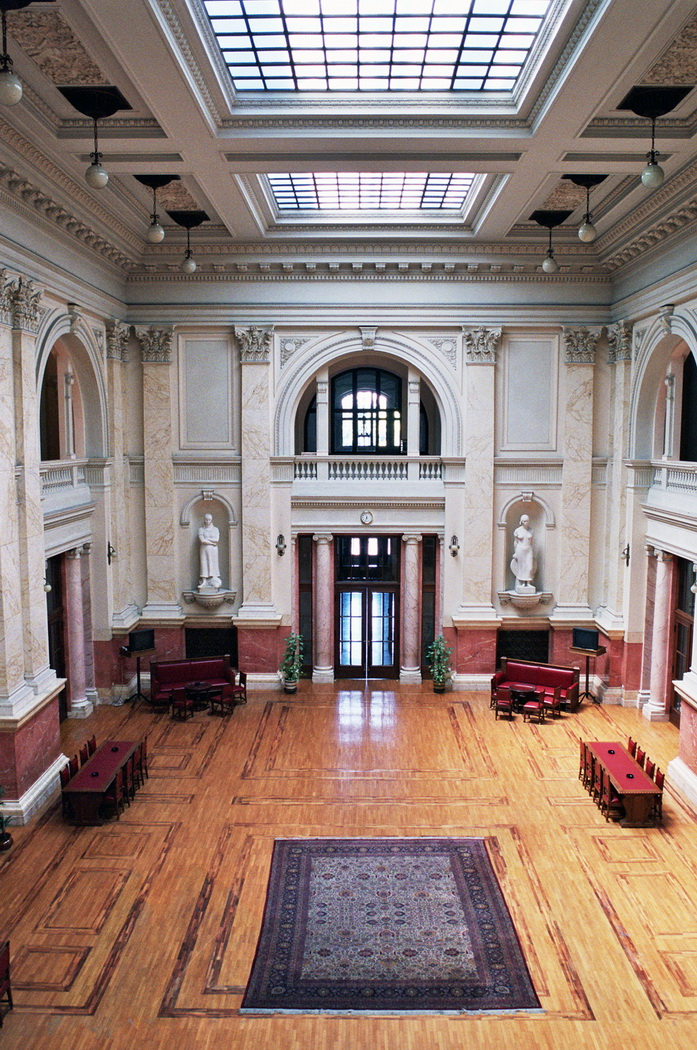
House of the National Assembly, Belgrade, 1934

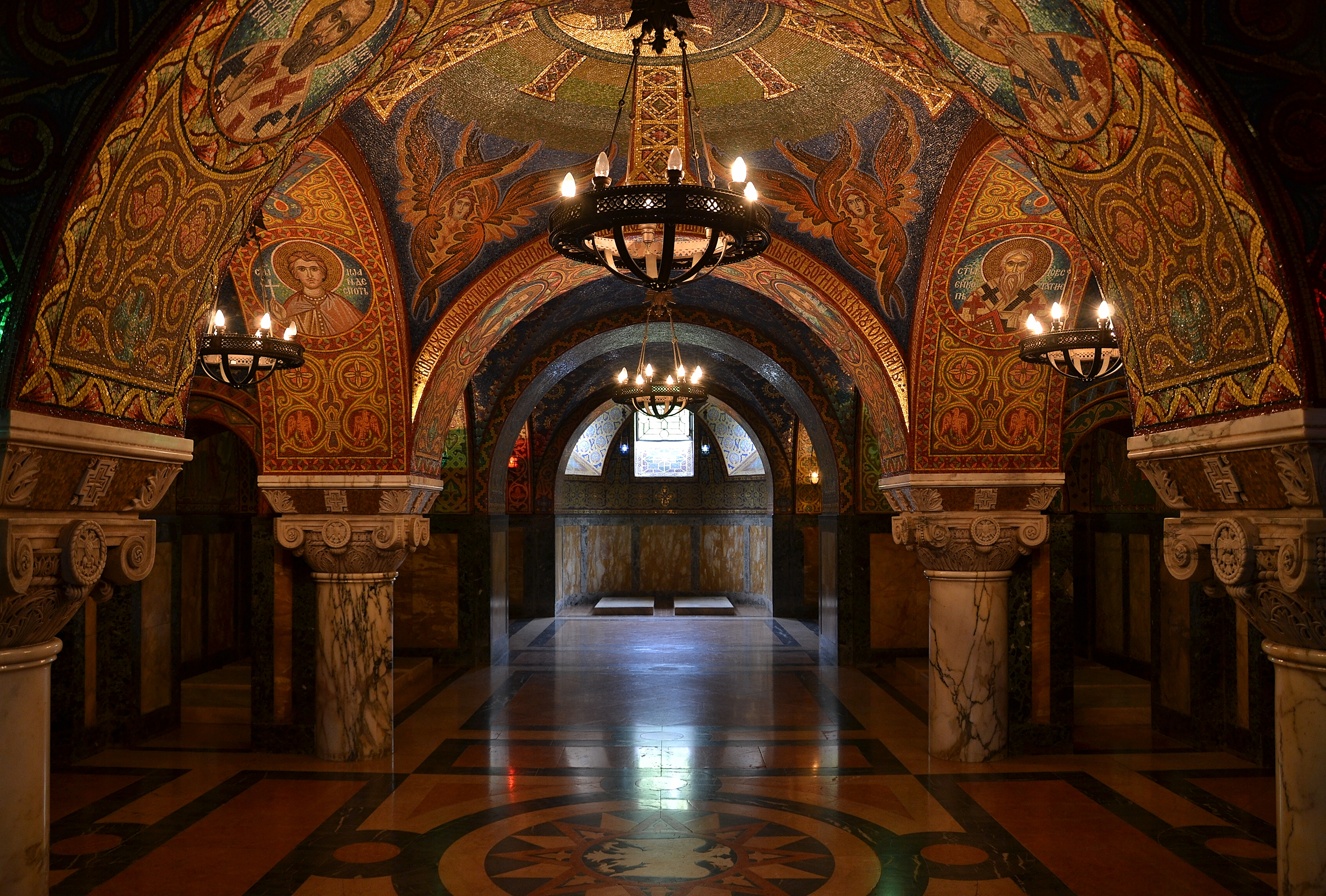
St. George's Church, Topola
