= Kokkoz Jami Mosque =

Mosque in Sokolyne, Crimea

- Kökköz Cami
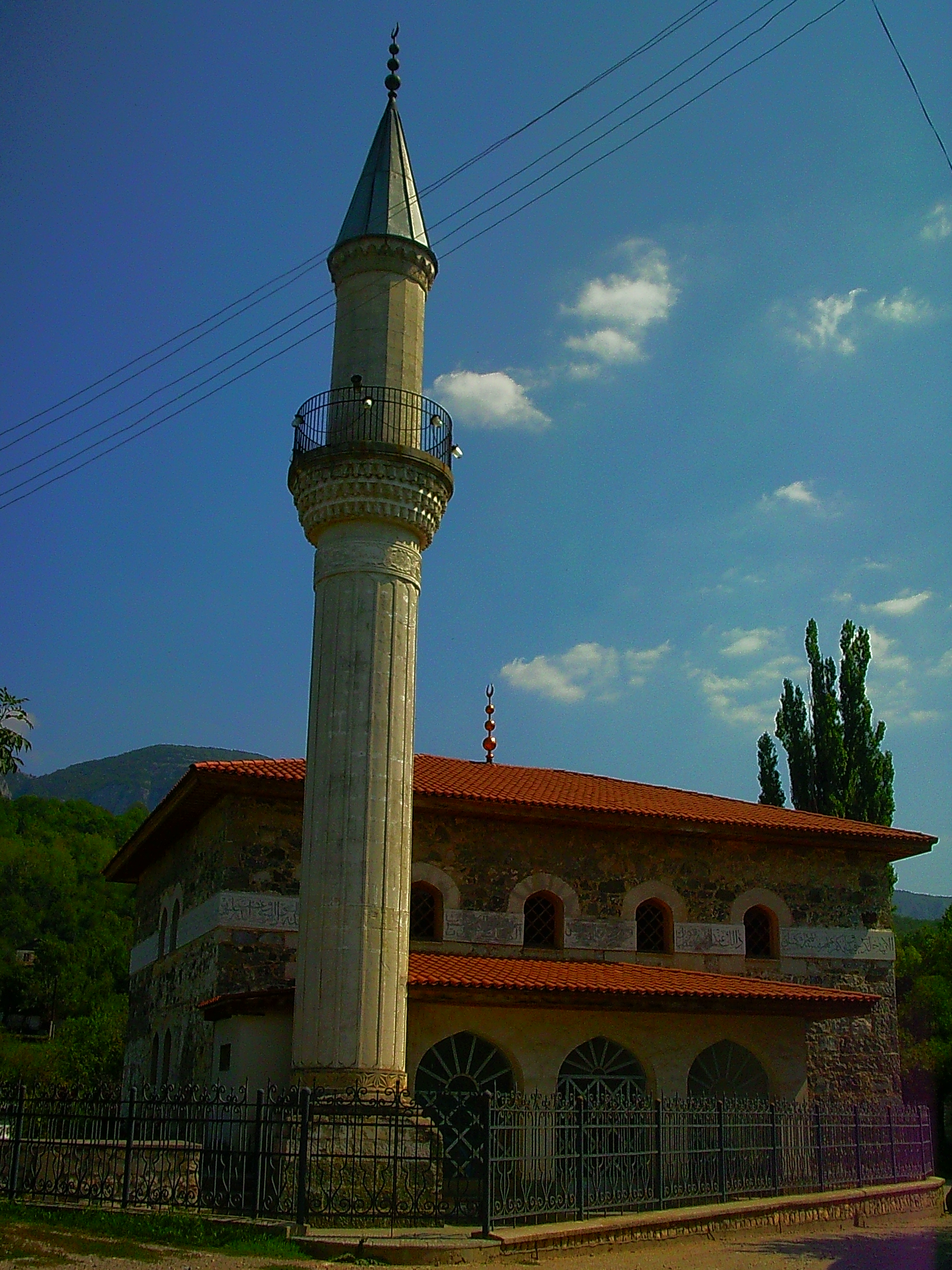

Religion
- Affiliation: Islam

Location
- Location: Sokolyne
- Interactive map of Kokkoz Jami Mosque
- Coordinates: 44.54994°N 33.95964°E

Architecture
- Architect: Nikolay Krasnov
- Type: Mosque
- Established: 1910
- Minaret: 1

The Kokkoz Jami Mosque, also known as Yusupov's Mosque, is located in the village of Sokolyne (Kökköz), Crimea. In Crimean Tatar, kökköz translates to “falcon”, just like the Ukrainian and Russian names. The mosque was built under the patronage of Prince Felix Yusupov in 1910 by a notable contemporary architect Nikolay Krasnov, the author of the imperial residence Livadia Palace.

== History ==
The mosque is located near the former hunting lodge of Prince Felix Yusupov. Beginning of the 20th century, it became a fashion among the Russian Imperial nobility (predominantly Orthodox Christian) to make charitable contributions towards the construction of mosques in Crimea, so Prince Yusupov, one of the richest men of the Empire, supposedly followed suit.

The rectangular building of Yusupov's mosque in Kokkoz has a basilican type. The walls of the mosque are decorated with inscriptions in Arabic and two circles of lancet windows. The roof is clay tile, a minaret stands next to the main building.

In 1930, the mosque was closed and turned into a warehouse. Later, after World War II, it was used as the village clubhouse and cinema. A planned demolition of the minaret by the Soviet regime was never realised. After 1990, returned survivors of the deportations of Crimean Tatars applied to return the building to the community, which was finalized in 1997. To date, the mosque has remained in very good condition and was recently renovated.

== See also ==
- Religion in Crimea
- List of mosques in Russia
- List of mosques in Europe
