= Yusupov Palace =

Yusupov Palace may refer to:

- Moika Palace, also known as Yusupov Palace (Russian: Дворец Юсуповых на Мойке, literally the Palace of the Yusupovs on the Moika), once the primary residence in St. Petersburg, Russia of the House of Yusupov
- Yusupov Palace (Crimea), in Koreiz, in the Yalta region of Crimea
