= Livadia Palace =

Museum in Livadiya, Crimea

- Ливадийский дворец
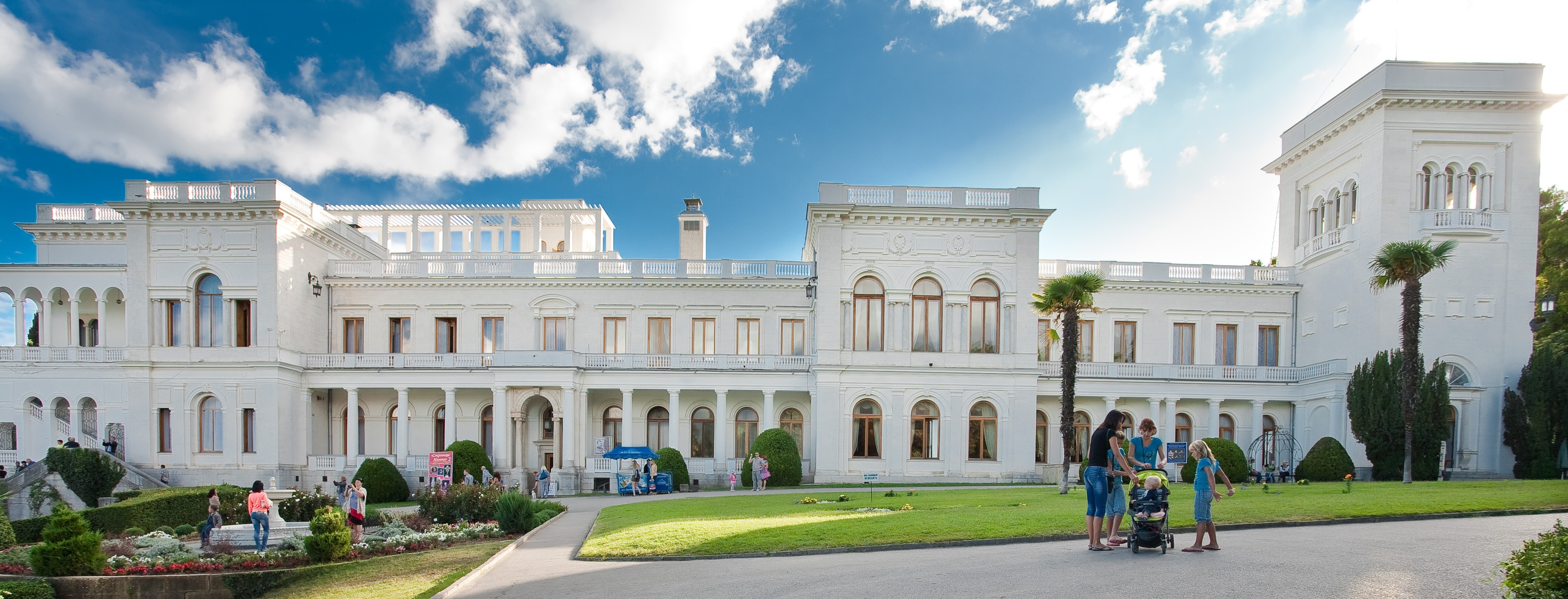
- Facade of the Livadia Palace

- Location within Crimea

General information
- Type: Palace
- Location: Livadiya, Crimea
- Coordinates: 44°28′04″N 34°08′36″E

Height
- Architectural: Neo-Renaissance

Technical details
- Material: White Crimean limestone

Other information
- Number of rooms: 116

Website
- Official site of the Livadia Palace

Immovable Monument of National Significance of Ukraine
- Official name: Комплекс споруд палацу (Building complex of the palace)
- Type: Architecture
- Reference no.: 0100115

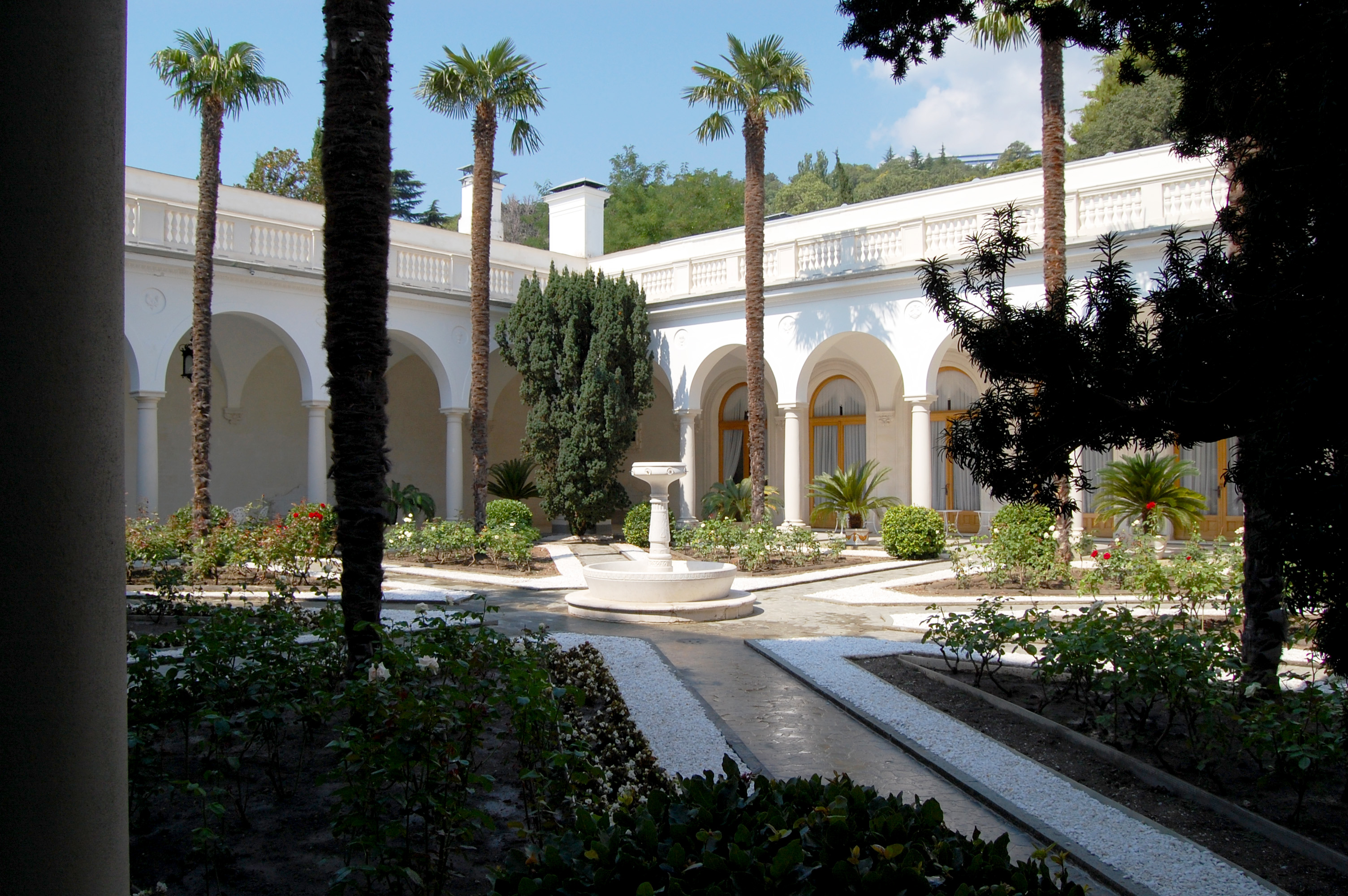
An Italian courtyard of the Livadia Palace

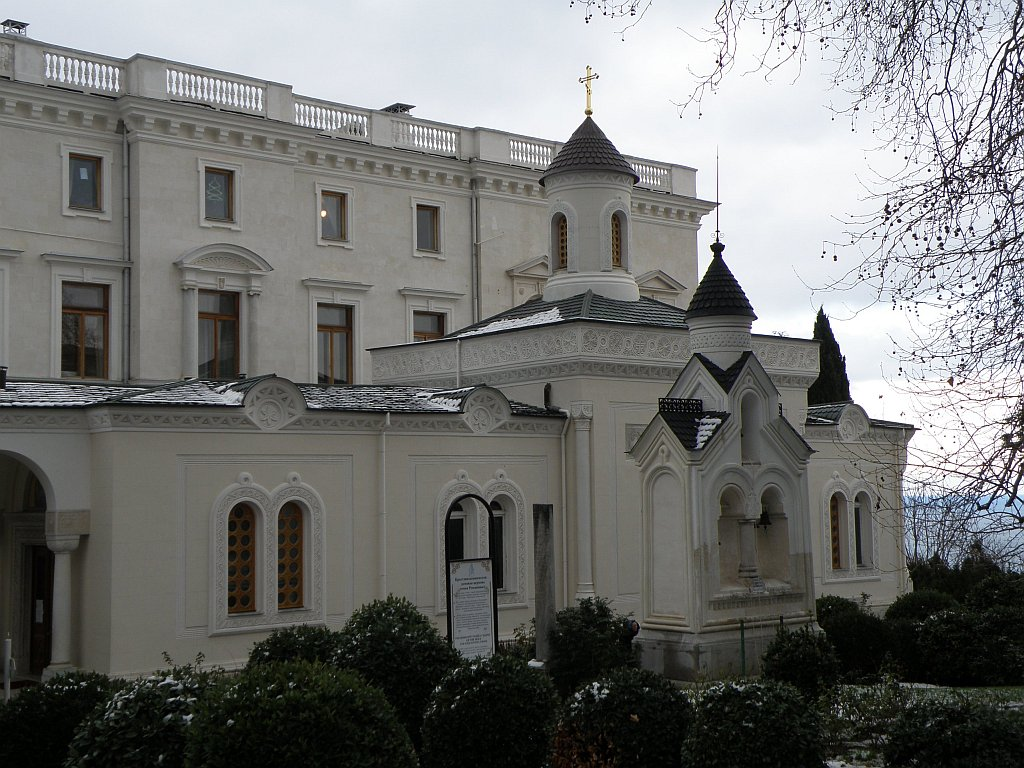
The chapel

Livadia Palace (Russian: Ливадийский дворец; Ukrainian: Лівадійський палац) is a former summer retreat of the last Russian tsar, Nicholas II, and his family in Livadiya, Crimea. The Yalta Conference was held there in 1945, when the palace housed the apartments of Franklin Delano Roosevelt and other members of the American delegation – the Soviet delegation was housed in the Yusupov Palace, and the British in the Vorontsov Palace some eight kilometers distant. The palace houses a museum, and is sometimes used for international summits.

== History ==
Formerly granted to Lambros Katsonis and later a possession of the Potocki family, the Livadia estate became a summer residence of the Russian imperial family in the 1860s, when architect Ippolito Monighetti built a large palace, a small palace, and a church there. The residence was frequented by Alexander II of Russia, while his successor Alexander III used to live, and died in the smaller palace. His son Nicholas II decided to have the larger palace demolished and replaced with a larger structure. The smaller Malyj (Small) Palace was preserved, as the place of his father's death, but was later destroyed during World War II.

Around 1909, Nikolay Krasnov, Yalta's most fashionable architect, responsible for the grand ducal residences in Koreiz, was engaged to prepare plans for a new imperial palace. The Tsar's diary indicates that the design was much discussed in the Imperial Family; it was decided that all four façades of the palace should look different. After 17 months of construction, the new palace was inaugurated on 11 September 1911. In November Grand Duchess Olga Nikolaevna celebrated her 16th birthday at Livadia.

After the February Revolution in 1917, Nicholas's mother, Dowager Empress Maria Feodorovna, fled to Livadia with some other members of the Imperial family. They were eventually rescued by the British ship HMS Marlborough, sent by the Dowager Empress's nephew, King George V.

Following the Russian Revolution of 1917, the palace was nationalised and, in accordance with the decree of the Council of People’s Commissars of the RSFSR “On the Use of Crimea for the Treatment of Workers” (Ob ispolʹzovanii Kryma dlia lecheniia trudiashchikhsia) of 21 December 1920, signed by Vladimir Lenin, was converted into a sanatorium for workers. From 1925 to 1931 it operated as the Peasant Sanatorium of the People’s Commissariat of Health, specialising in anti-tuberculosis and general therapeutic treatment. Between 1931 and 1941 it functioned as a climatic-treatment combine and health-resort complex. After wartime occupation and damage, the palace was restored and resumed its sanatorium role. Parts of the building reopened to the public in 1974, and it now functions as a museum. Contrary to some modern claims, there is no documentary evidence that the palace was ever used as a psychiatric hospital.

During the Second World War, a ceremony marking the successful completion of the German Crimean Campaign (1941–1942), with the capture of Sevastopol by the German 11th Army under the command of General Erich von Manstein, and Manstein's promotion to the rank of Generalfeldmarschall (field marshal), was held in the garden of Livadia Palace on July 6, 1942. Participants included officers, non-commissioned officers and soldiers who were awarded the German "Ritterkreuz" (Knight's Cross) and the "Deutsches Kreuz in Gold" (German Cross in Gold).

The palace became a historical museum. Most of the historical furnishings have been lost, but anything that has been recovered can be seen for a small fee. In August 2007 the palace was recognized as a landmark of modern history by the Seven Wonders of Ukraine project. Ukrainian pop singer Sofia Rotaru, who celebrated her 60th birthday at the palace in the company of the presidents of Russia, Ukraine, and Moldova – the second such meeting since the Yalta Conference – funded the restoration of Livadia Palace in 2008.

Numerous academic conferences have been held at the palace. Palace staff actively publish their research. Visitors are particularly interested in the events of 1945.

On 18 November 2017, the 123rd anniversary of Tsar Alexander III's burial, Russian president Vladimir Putin dedicated a monument to Alexander III on the grounds of the Livadia Palace.

== Architecture ==
The Livadia Palace is built of white Crimean limestone in the Neo-Renaissance style. The edifice features an arched portico of Carrara marble, a spacious Arabic patio, an Italian patio, a Florentine tower, ornate Bramantesque windows, a "balcony-belvedere", and multiple bays with jasper vases. A gallery connects the palace with a neo-Byzantine church of the Exaltation of the Cross, built by Monighetti in 1866.

The palace contains 116 rooms, with interiors furnished in different styles. There are a Pompeian vestibule, an English billiard-room, a Neo-baroque dining room, and a Jacob-style study of maple wood, which elicited particular admiration of Nicholas II.

== See also ==
- Tsar's Path, passes above the palace complex
- Dulber, nearby palace designed by the same architect
- Yusupov Palace, another nearby palace
- Vorontsov Palace, in neighboring Alupka
