= Koreiz =

Koreiz Кореїз
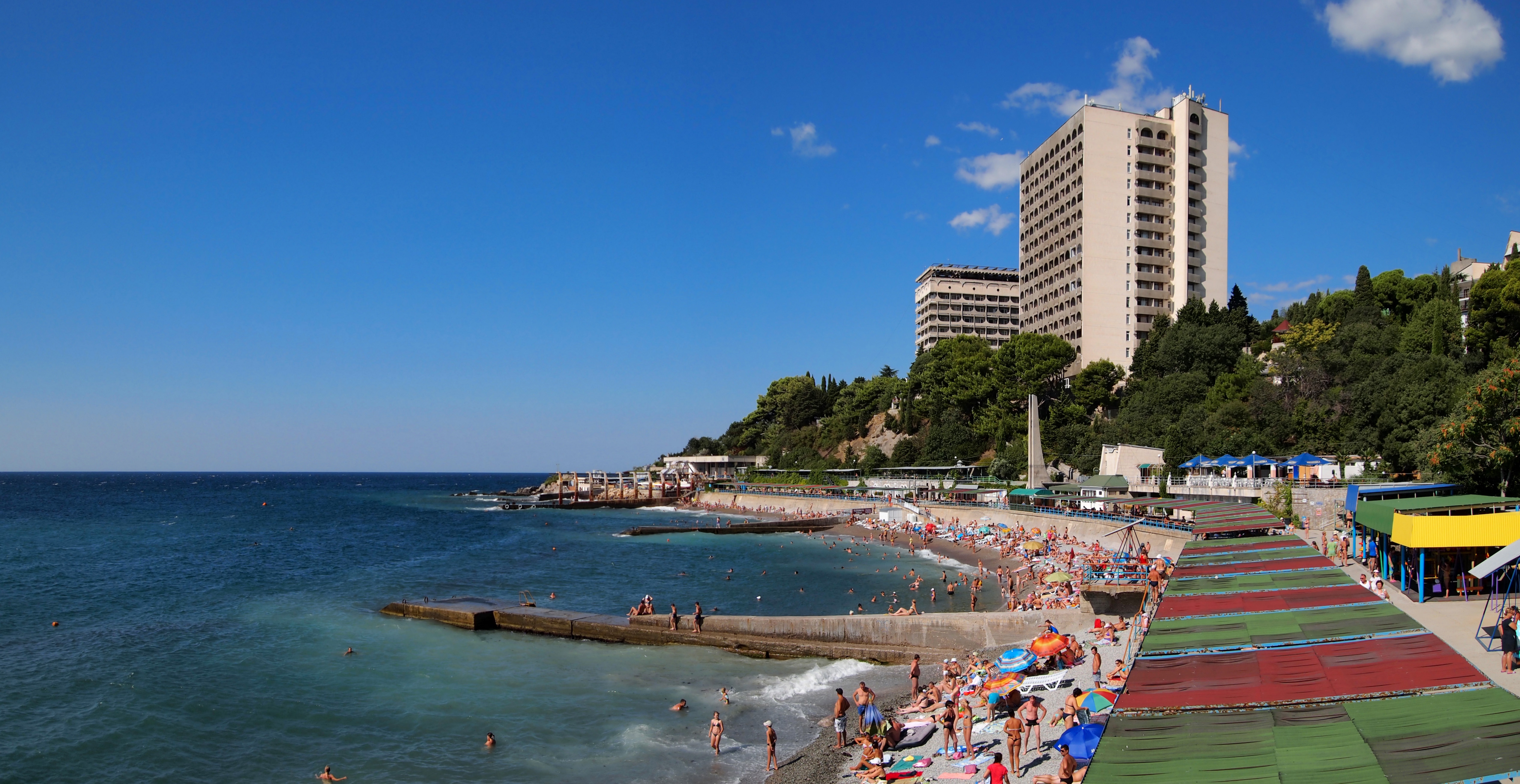

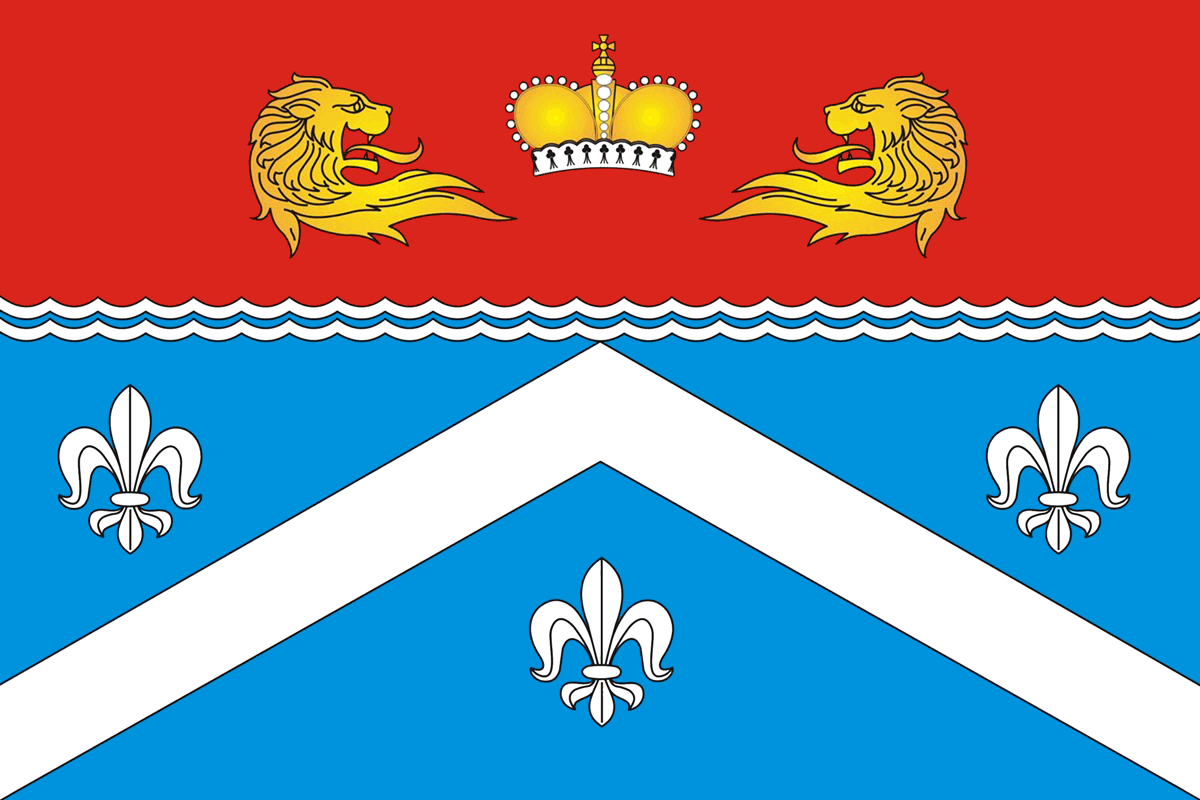
- Flag Coat of arms

- Location of Koreiz within the Crimea Koreiz (Crimea)
- Coordinates: 44°25′59″N 34°5′14″E
- Republic: Crimea
- Municipality: Yalta Municipality
- Local council: Koreiz
- Elevation: 120 m (390 ft)

Population (2014)
  - Total: 5,455
- Time zone: UTC+4 (MSK)
- Postal code: 98670 — 98675
- Area code: +380-654
- Climate: Cfa

Koreiz (Ukrainian: Кореїз; Russian: Кореиз; Crimean Tatar: Koreiz) is an urban-type settlement lying south-west of Yalta in the Yalta Municipality of the Autonomous Republic of Crimea, a territory recognized by a majority of countries as part of Ukraine and incorporated by Russia as the Republic of Crimea. The name of the town means "villages" in Greek (χωρεία, chorèa). Koreiz absorbed the nearby spa of Miskhor in 1958. Population: 5,455 (2014 Census).

Koreiz has arguably become best known as the site of two palaces:

- The palace of Grand Duke Peter Nicolaievich of Russia, known as Dulber (dülber in Crimean Tatar means "beautiful"), is an asymmetrical Moorish Revival architectural extravaganza with crenellated walls, silver domes, and more than 100 rooms, inspired by the Mameluk architecture of 15th-century Cairo. This palace was built between 1895 and 1897.
- Nikolai Petrovich Krasnov, an architect who worked on the imperial Livadia Palace in nearby Yalta, built the Yusupov Palace for Prince Felix Yusupov in 1909. The palace, whose style may be described as Renaissance Revival and Roman Revival, boasts a romantic park with exotic plants and a wine cellar founded by Prince Lev Galitzine in the 19th century. After the Russian Revolution of 1917 the Soviet authorities nationalised the palace; it served as Joseph Stalin's favourite dacha during the 1945 Yalta Conference and at other times.
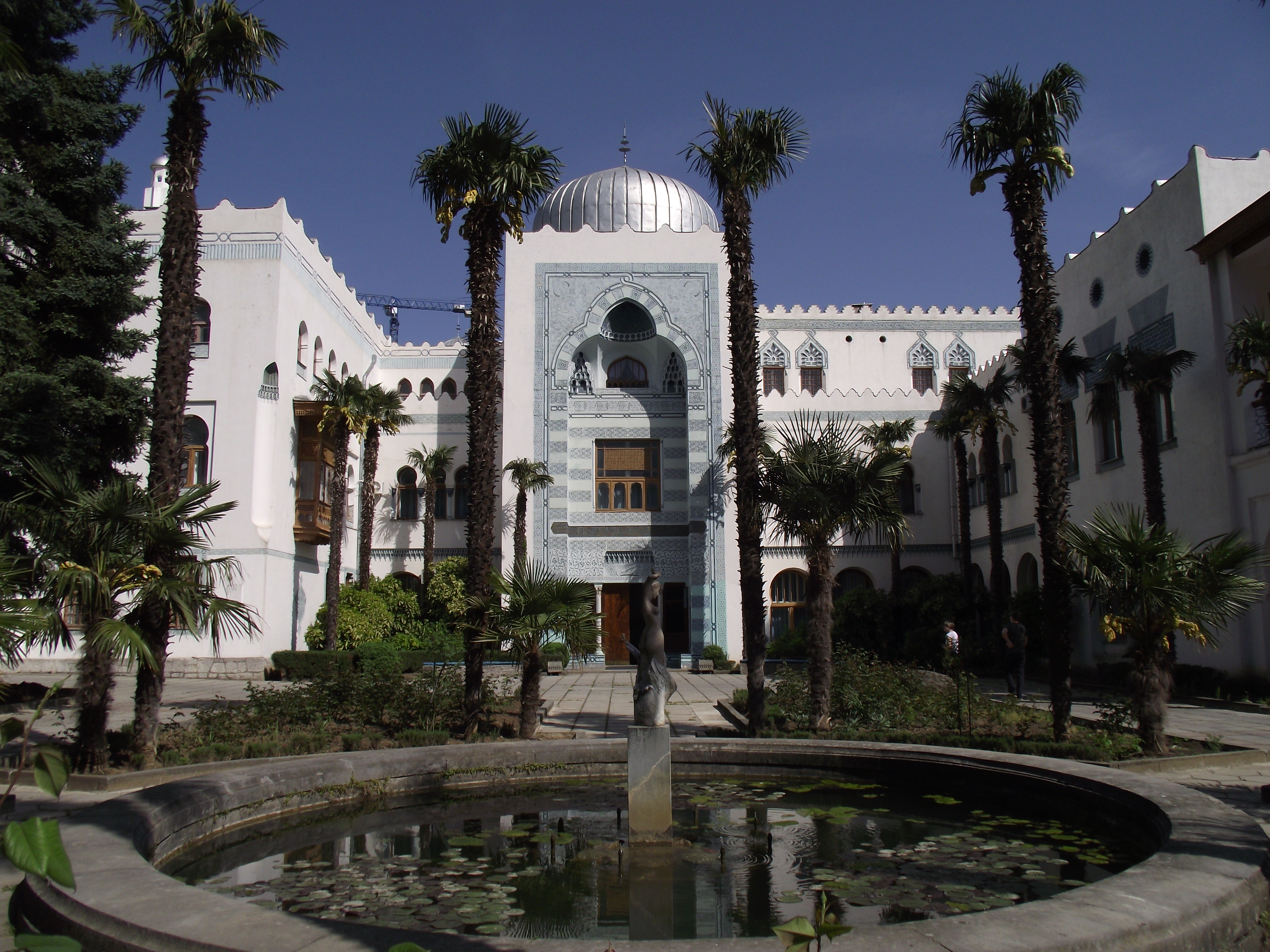
Dulber

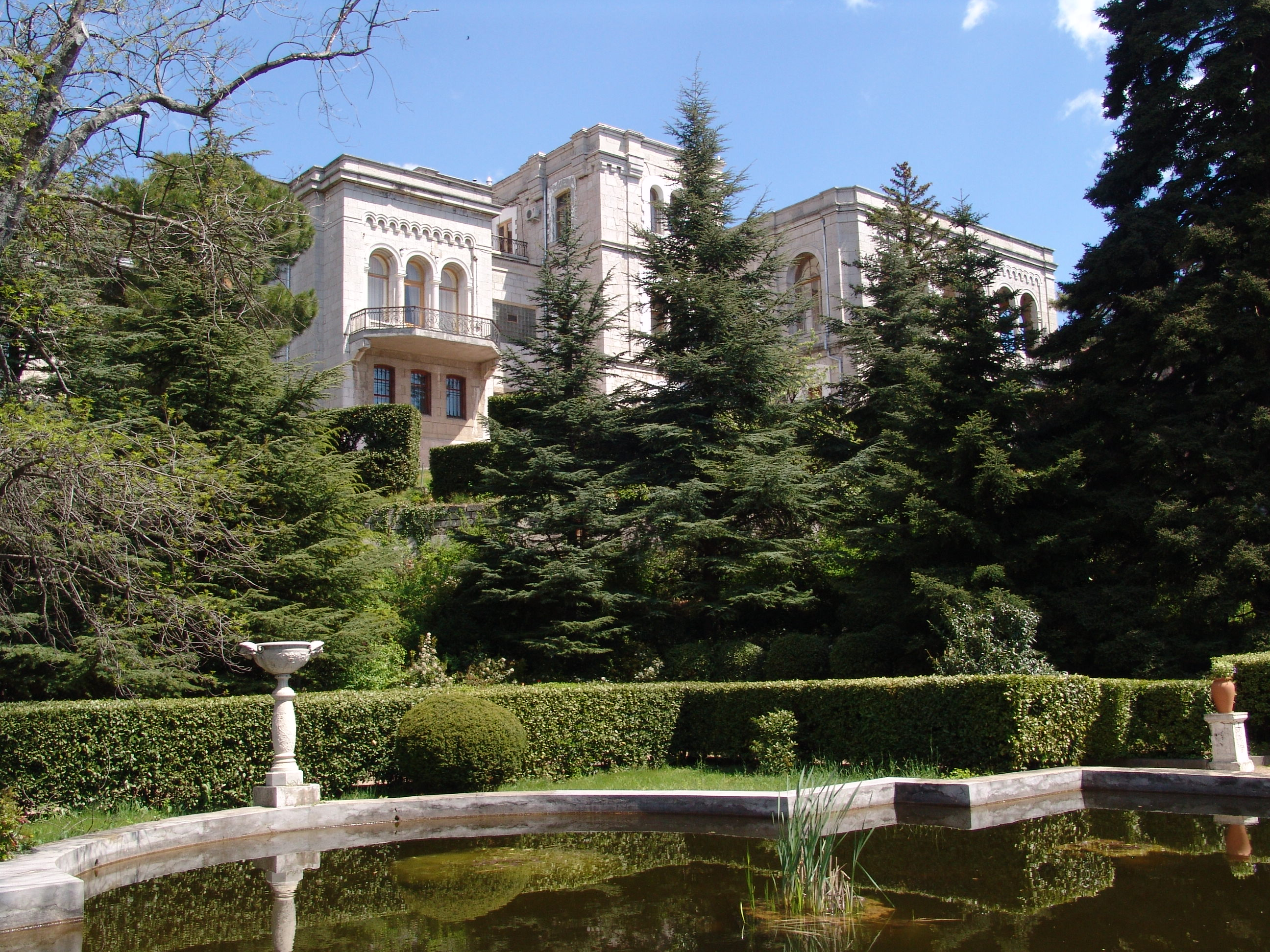
Yusupov Palace

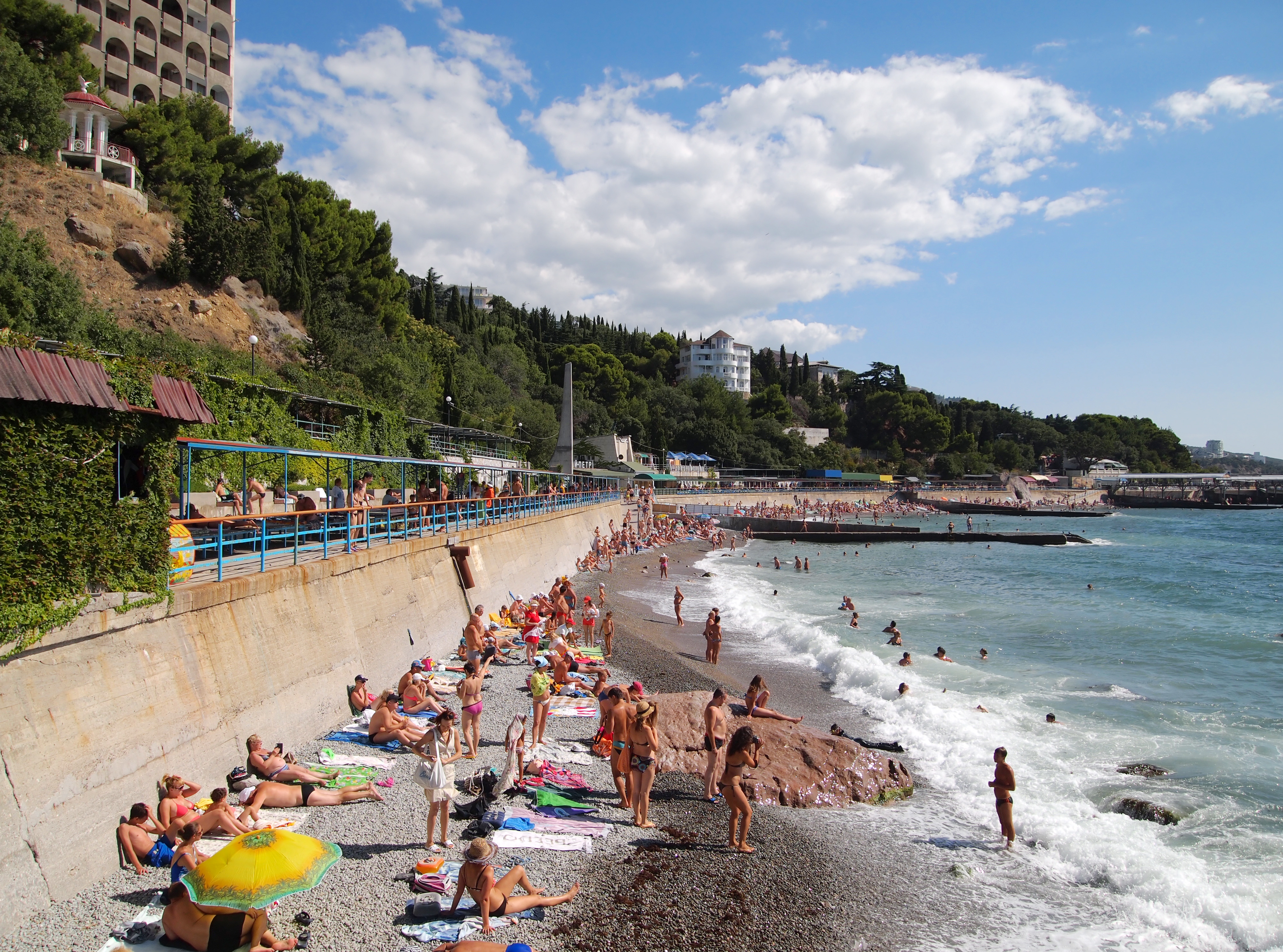
Tourism is an important sector of Koreiz's economy
