= Dulber Palace =

Coordinates: 44°25′46″N 34°05′40″E

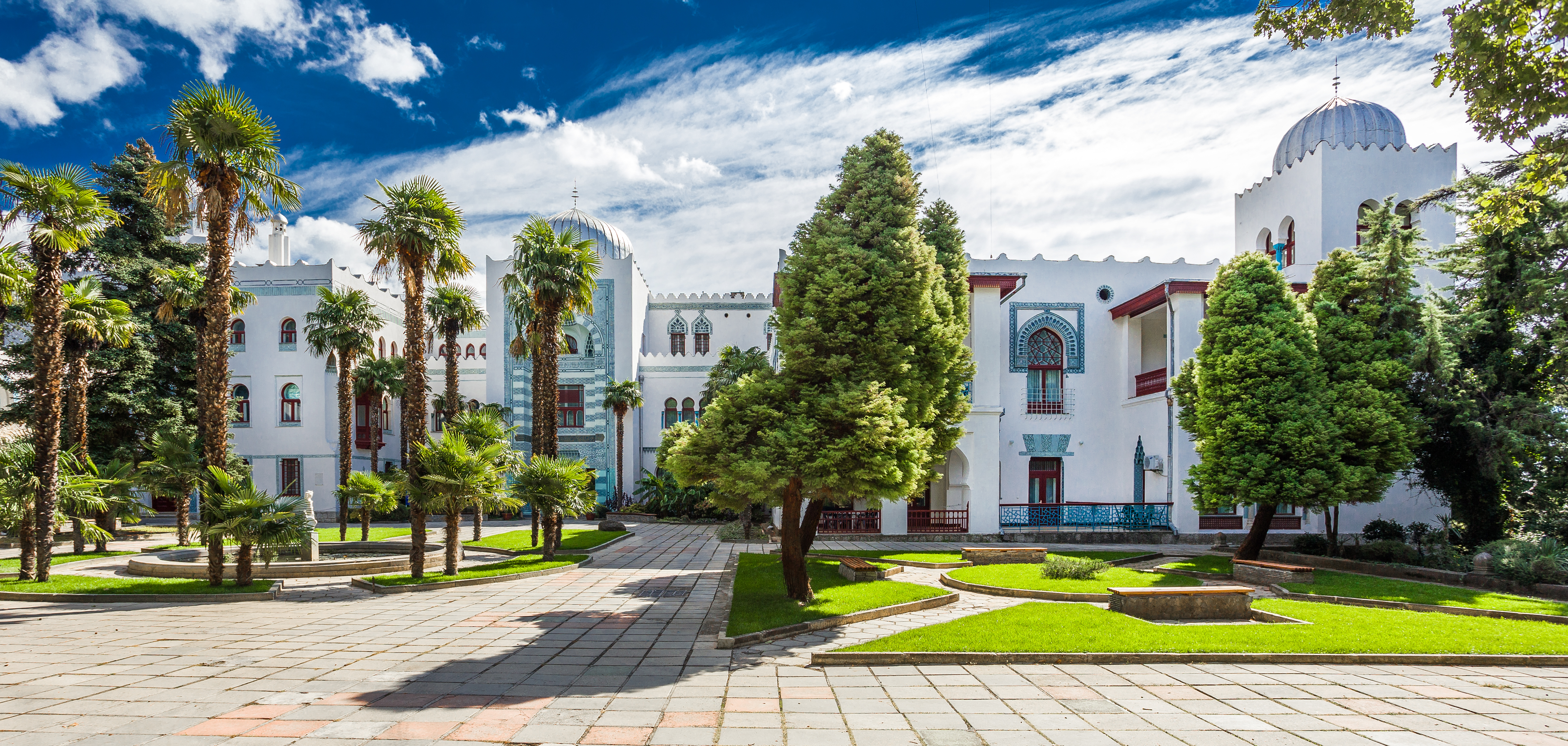
- Dulber Palace in 2013
- Interactive map of the Dulber Palace area

Immovable Monument of National Significance of Ukraine
- Official name: Палац “Дюльбер” (Dulber Palace)
- Type: Architecture
- Reference no.: 0100114

The Dulber Palace (Russian: Дворец Дюльбер; Ukrainian: Палац Дюльбер) is a Moorish Revival palace designed by Nikolay Krasnov in Koreiz, near Yalta in Crimea. Also known as the Palace of Grand Duke Peter Nikolaievich of Russia, Dulber Palace (dülber is Crimean Tatar for "beautiful", originally from Persian, del-bar, "heart-stealing", "beloved, beautiful"), is an asymmetrical architectural extravaganza with crenellated walls, silver domes, and more than 100 rooms, inspired by the Mameluk architecture of 15th-century Cairo.

== History of Dulber ==
The palace was built between 1895 and 1897 for Grand Duke Peter Nikolaievich of Russia, a first cousin once removed of Emperor Nicholas II and grandson of Emperor Nicholas I of Russia and his wife, Grand Duchess Militza. The design of Dulber was based on sketches the Grand Duke made during his travels to the Middle East and the construction was done under Grand Duke Peters supervision. Grand Duchess Militza designed much of the interior decoration herself, drawing on her studies of Persian architecture.

Dulber served as the summer residence of Grand Duke Peter and his wife and children until 1919.

After the Russian Revolution in 1917 Grand Duke Peter of and his family went to Dulber and stayed there until they escaped Russia in 1919 aboard the British battleship, HMS Marlborough. During the stay, they were joined in 1918 by other members of the Russian imperial family, including the Dowager Empress Maria Feodorovna and her daughter Grand Duchess Xenia Alexandrovna of Russia. Dulbers fortress-like walls could offer better protection from the Bolsheviks operating in the area than the other imperial palaces in the Crimea. Thus, the Dowager Empress was relocated there from the Palace of Ai-Todor in 1918 when there was a real threat to her life as well as that of other members of the imperial family.

After the Russian Revolution of 1917 and the imperial families departure in 1919, the palace was nationalised.

In 2014, Russia illegally annexed Crimea.

== See also ==
- Yusupov Palace, also in Koreiz, built for Prince Felix Yusupov in 1909
