= Yusupov Palace (Crimea) =

Palace in Crimea

Coordinates: 44°25′57″N 34°05′22″E

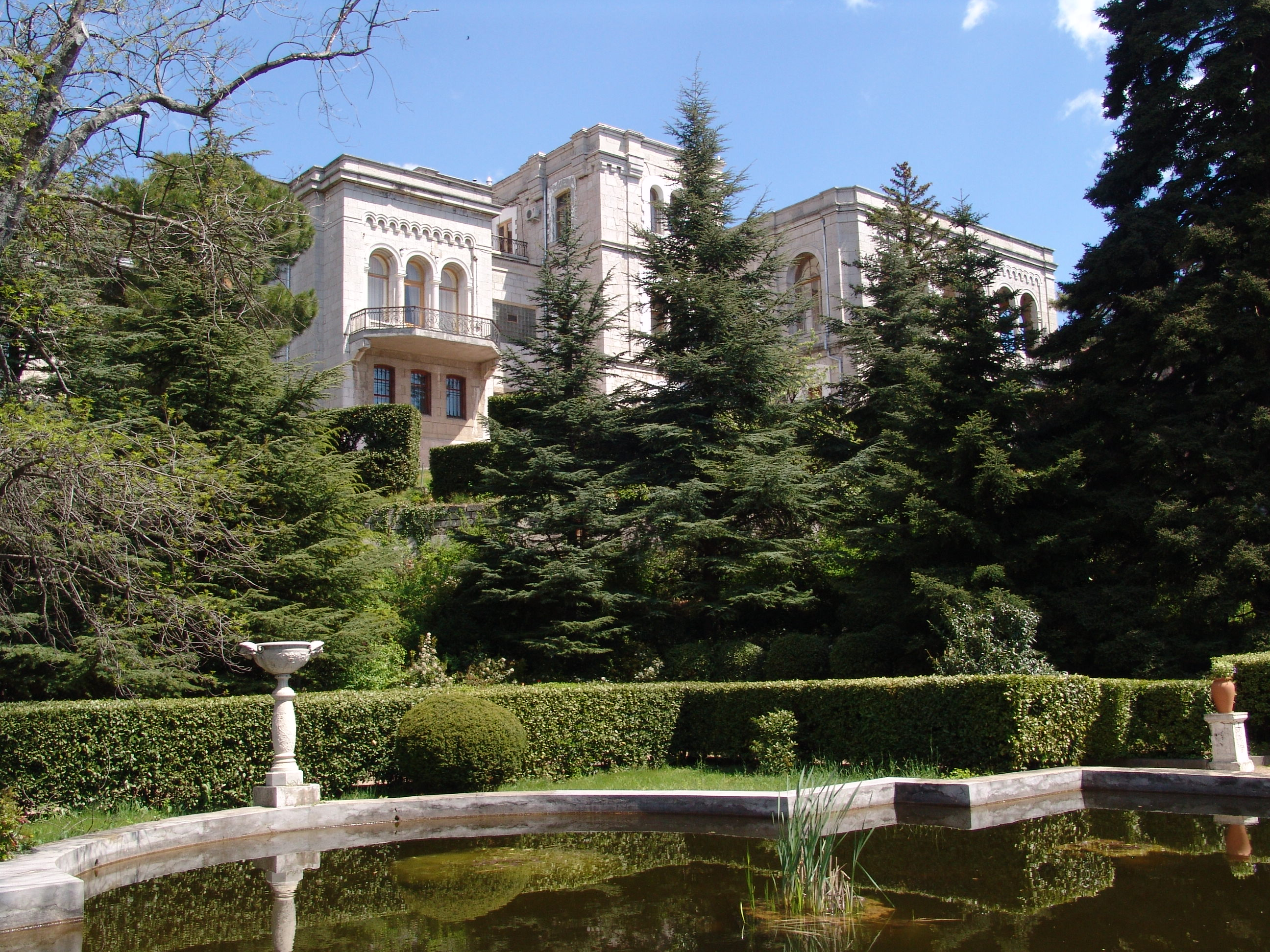
The Yusupov Palace in Miskhor

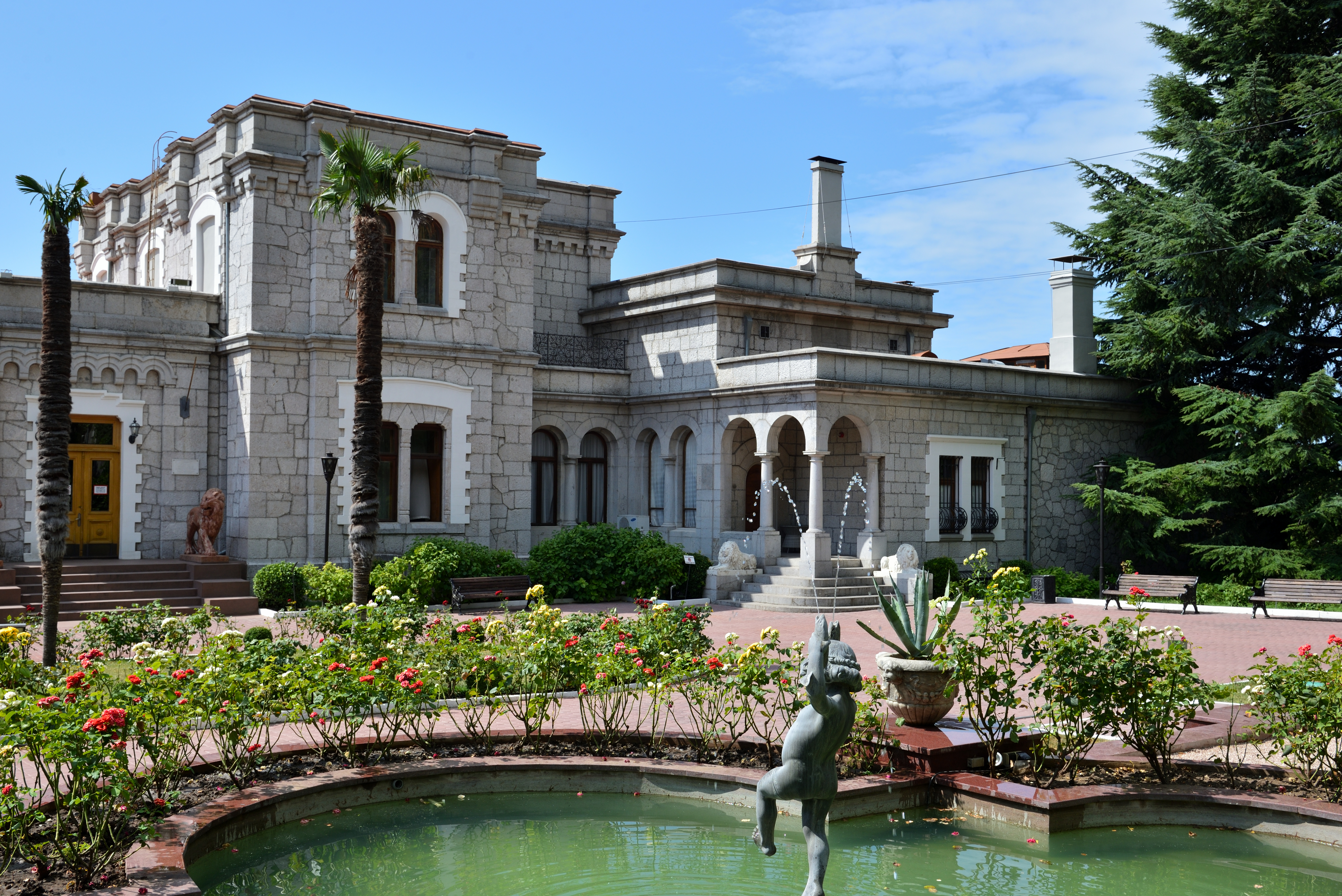
Fountain near the entrance

The Yusupov Palace (Ukrainian: Юсуповський палац; Russian: Юсуповский дворец) is a palace located in the town of Koreiz, near Yalta in Crimea. It was built for Prince Felix Yusupov-Soumorokov-Elston and his wife Princess Zinaida Yusupova (1861–1939) in 1909 by Nikolay Krasnov, the architect responsible for the imperial Livadia Palace in nearby Yalta. The palace, whose style may be described as Renaissance Revival and Roman Revival, boasts a romantic park with exotic plants and a wine cellar founded by Prince Lev Galitzine in the 19th century.

After the Russian Revolution of 1917, the palace was nationalised and served as Joseph Stalin's favourite dacha during the Yalta Conference and at other times.

From 1991 to March 2014 Yusupov Palace was owned by the President of Ukraine. On 21 October 2014, The Council of Ministers of Crimea decided to transfer to use for the president of Russia.

After the Annexation of Crimea to Russia in March 2014, the Yusupov Palace became a special complex for the administration of affairs of the President of the Russian Federation.

== See also ==
- Dulber, another palace in Koreiz
- Yusupov Palace on the Moika, St. Petersburg
