= HMS Marlborough =

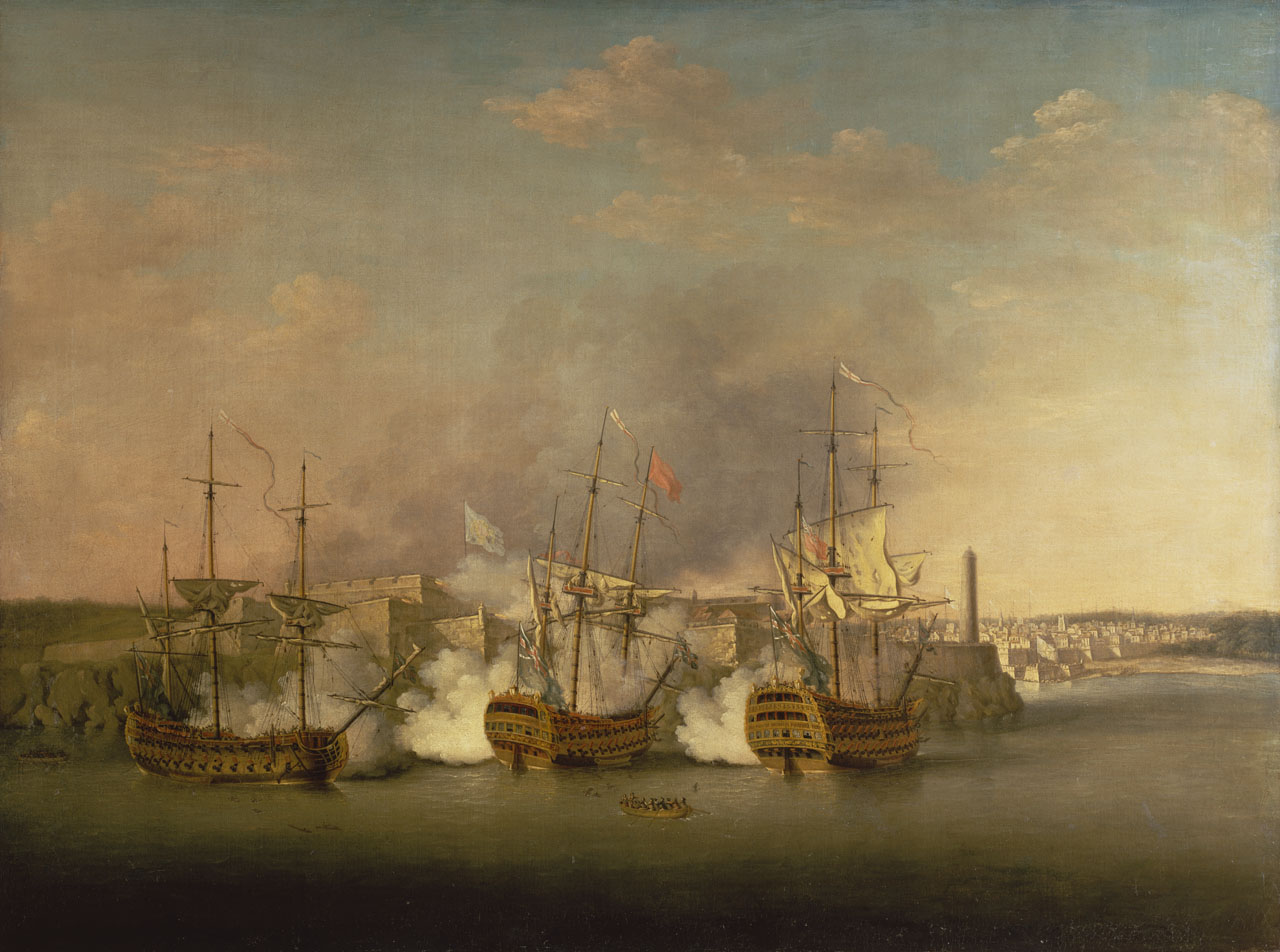
The bombardment of Marro Castle on Havana - HMS Marlborough, left

Six warships of the Royal Navy have been named HMS Marlborough after the Duke of Marlborough:

- HMS St Michael (1669), a second rate, renamed Marlborough 1706; fought in the Seven Years' War; present in Sir George Pocock's fleet at the taking of Havana from the Spanish 1762; foundered at sea 1762.
- HMS Marlborough (1767), a third rate built 1767; fought in the American Revolutionary War; heavily damaged in the Battle of the Glorious First of June 1794; wrecked 1800.
- HMS Marlborough (1807), a third rate built 1807; broken up 1835.
- HMS Marlborough (1855), a first rate screw ship built 1855; renamed Vernon II 1904; sank on her way to being broken up 1924.
- HMS Marlborough (1912), an Iron Duke-class battleship built 1912; fought in the Battle of Jutland 1916; decommissioned 1932. This ship evacuated surviving members of the Russian royal family, the Romanovs, from the Crimea during the Russian Civil War.
- HMS Marlborough (F233), a Type 23 frigate launched 1989; sold to the Chilean Navy 2008; renamed Almirante Condell.

HMS Marlborough was also an Electrical Training shore station in Eastbourne during and shortly after World War II.

== Battle honours ==
Ships named Marlborough have earned the following battle honours:

- Martinique, 1762
- Havana, 1762
- St Vincent, 1780
- The Saints, 1782
- First of June, 1794
- Jutland, 1916

== Literature ==
- The book HMS Marlborough Will Enter Harbour by Nicholas Monsarrat featured a fictional sloop named HMS Marlborough in World War II.
