= Yalta Conference =

1945 WWII allied discussion of postwar reorganization

Coordinates: 44°28′04″N 34°08′36″E

Yalta Conference Crimean Conference
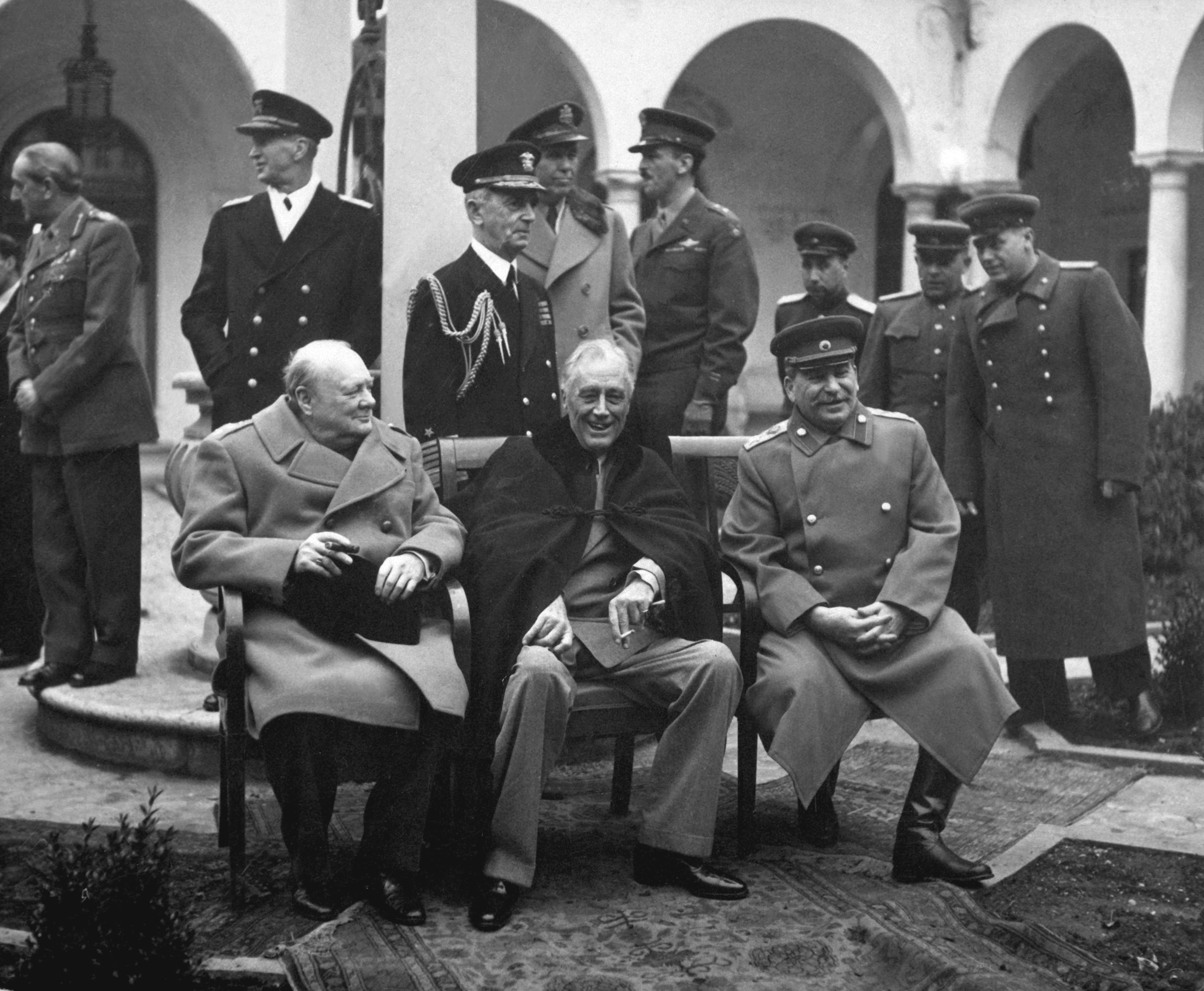
- The "Big Three" at the Yalta Conference, Winston Churchill, Franklin D. Roosevelt and Joseph Stalin. Behind them standing, from the left, Field Marshal Sir Alan Brooke, Fleet Admiral Ernest King, Fleet Admiral William D. Leahy, General of the Army George Marshall, Major General Laurence S. Kuter, General Aleksei Antonov, Vice Admiral Stepan Kucherov, and Admiral of the Fleet Nikolay Kuznetsov.
- Host country: Soviet Union
- Date: 4–11 February 1945
- Cities: Yalta, Crimean ASSR, Russian SFSR, Soviet Union
- Venues: Livadia Palace
- Participants: (Soviet Union) Joseph Stalin; (United Kingdom) Winston Churchill; (United States) Franklin D. Roosevelt
- Follows: Tehran Conference
- Precedes: Potsdam Conference

The Yalta Conference (Russian: Ялтинская конференция, romanized: Yaltinskaya konferentsiya), held 4–11 February 1945, was the World War II meeting of the heads of government of the United States, the United Kingdom, and the Soviet Union to discuss the postwar reorganization of Germany and Europe. The three states were represented by President Franklin D. Roosevelt, Prime Minister Winston Churchill, and General Secretary Joseph Stalin. The conference was held near Yalta in Crimea, Soviet Union, within the Livadia, Yusupov, and Vorontsov palaces.

The aim of the conference was to shape a postwar peace that represented not only a collective security order, but also a plan to give self-determination to the liberated peoples of Europe. Intended mainly to discuss the re-establishment of the nations of war-torn Europe, within a few years, with the Cold War dividing the continent, the conference became a subject of intense controversy.

Yalta was the second of three major wartime conferences among the Big Three. It was preceded by the Tehran Conference in November 1943 and was followed by the Potsdam Conference in July 1945. It was also preceded by a conference in Moscow in October 1944, not attended by Roosevelt, in which Churchill and Stalin had reached an informal agreement on Western and Soviet spheres of influence in Europe.

== Conference ==
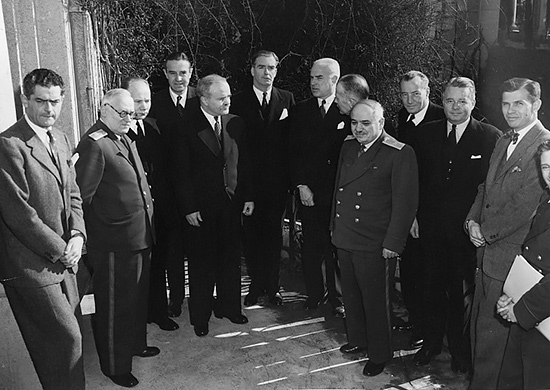
Soviet, American and British diplomats during the Yalta conference

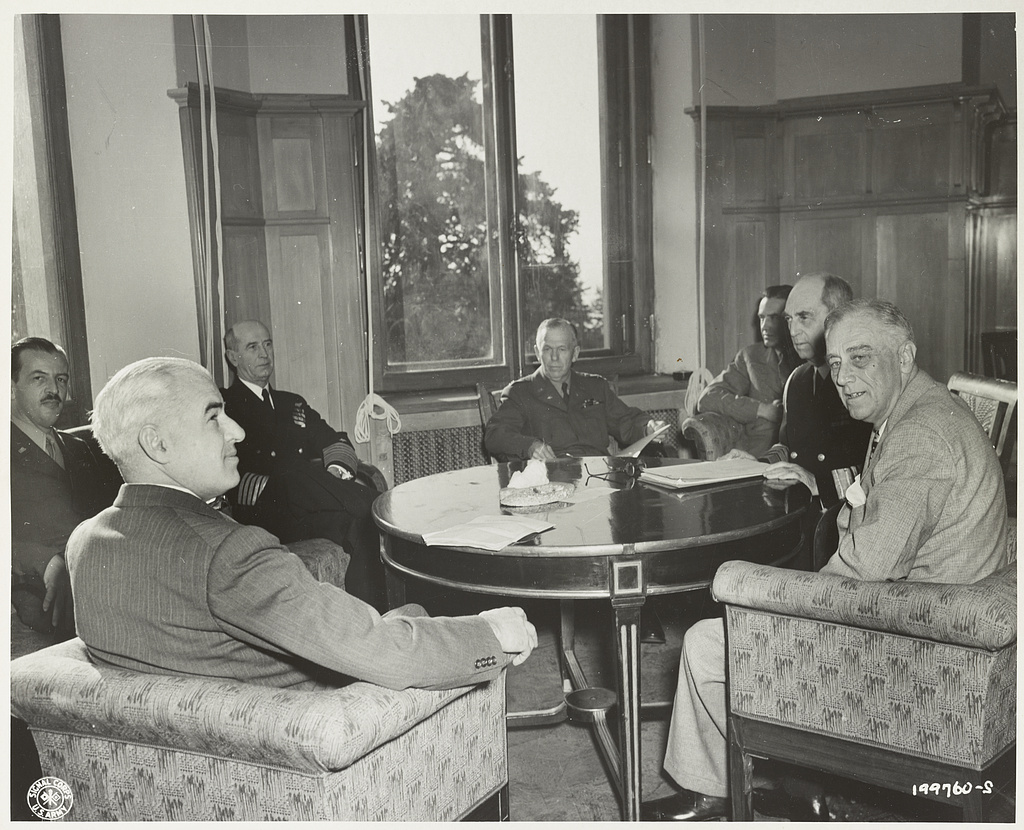
Yalta American Delegation in Livadia Palace from left to right: Secretary of State Edward Stettinius, Maj. Gen. L. S. Kuter, Admiral E. J. King, General George C. Marshall, Ambassador Averell Harriman, Admiral William Leahy, and President F. D. Roosevelt. Livadia Palace, Crimea, RSFSR

By the time of the Yalta Conference, the Western Allies had liberated all of France and Belgium and were fighting on the western border of Germany. In the east, Soviet forces were 65 km (40 mi) from Berlin, having already pushed back the Germans from Poland, Romania, and Bulgaria. There was no longer a question regarding German defeat. The issue was the new shape of postwar Europe.

The French leader General Charles de Gaulle was not invited to either the Yalta or Potsdam Conferences, a diplomatic slight that was the occasion for deep and lasting resentment. De Gaulle attributed his exclusion from Yalta to the longstanding personal antagonism towards him by Roosevelt, but the Soviets had also objected to his inclusion as a full participant. However, the absence of French representation at Yalta also meant that extending an invitation for de Gaulle to attend the Potsdam Conference would have been highly problematic since he would have felt honor-bound to insist that all issues agreed at Yalta in his absence be reopened.

The initiative for calling a second "Big Three" conference had come from Roosevelt, who hoped for a meeting before the US presidential elections in November 1944 but pressed for a meeting early in 1945 at a neutral location in the Mediterranean. Malta, Cyprus, Sicily, Athens, and Jerusalem were all suggested. Stalin, insisting that his doctors opposed any long trips, rejected those options. He proposed instead for them to meet at the Black Sea resort of Yalta in the Crimea. Stalin's fear of flying also was a contributing factor in the decision.

Each of the three leaders had his own agenda for postwar Germany and liberated Europe. Roosevelt wanted Soviet support in the Pacific War against Japan, specifically for the planned invasion of Japan (Operation August Storm), as well as Soviet participation in the United Nations. Churchill pressed for free elections and democratic governments in Central and Eastern Europe, specifically Poland. Stalin demanded a Soviet sphere of political influence in Eastern and Central Europe as an essential aspect of the Soviets' national security strategy, and his position at the conference was felt by him to be so strong that he could dictate terms. According to US delegation member and future Secretary of State James F. Byrnes, "it was not a question of what we would let the Russians do, but what we could get the Russians to do".

Poland was the first item on the Soviet agenda. Stalin stated, "For the Soviet government, the question of Poland was one of honor" and security because Poland had served as a historical corridor for forces attempting to invade Russia. In addition, Stalin stated regarding history that "because the Russians had greatly sinned against Poland", "the Soviet government was trying to atone for those sins". Stalin concluded that "Poland must be strong" and that "the Soviet Union is interested in the creation of a mighty, free and independent Poland". Accordingly, Stalin stipulated that Polish government-in-exile demands were not negotiable, and the Soviets would regain the territory of eastern Poland that they had lost in the Polish-Soviet War with Poland to be compensated for that by extending its western borders at the expense of Germany.

Roosevelt wanted the Soviets to enter the Pacific War against Japan with the Allies, which he hoped would end the war sooner and reduce American casualties.

One Soviet precondition for a declaration of war against Japan was an American official recognition of the Mongolian independence from China (the Mongolian People's Republic had been a Soviet satellite state from 1924 to World War II). The Soviets also wanted the recognition of Soviet interests in the Chinese Eastern Railway and Port Arthur but not asking the Chinese to lease.

The Soviets wanted the return of South Sakhalin, which had been taken from Russia by Japan in the Russo-Japanese War in 1905, and the cession of the Kuril Islands by Japan, both of which were approved by the other Allies. In return, Stalin pledged that the Soviet Union would enter the Pacific War three months after the defeat of Germany.

The fate of Korea is not mentioned in the records of demands and concessions at Yalta. However, several declassified documents later revealed that on 8 February, while Churchill was not present, Roosevelt and Stalin secretly discussed the peninsula. Roosevelt brought up the idea of putting Korea into a trusteeship divided among the Soviets, the Americans, and the Chinese for a period of 20 to 30 years. He expressed reluctance to invite the British to the trusteeship, but Stalin reportedly replied that the British "would most certainly be offended. In fact, the Prime Minister might 'kill us'". Roosevelt agreed with the assessment. Stalin suggested the trusteeship be as short as possible. The two quickly agreed that their troops should not be stationed in Korea. Korea was not discussed again throughout the conference.

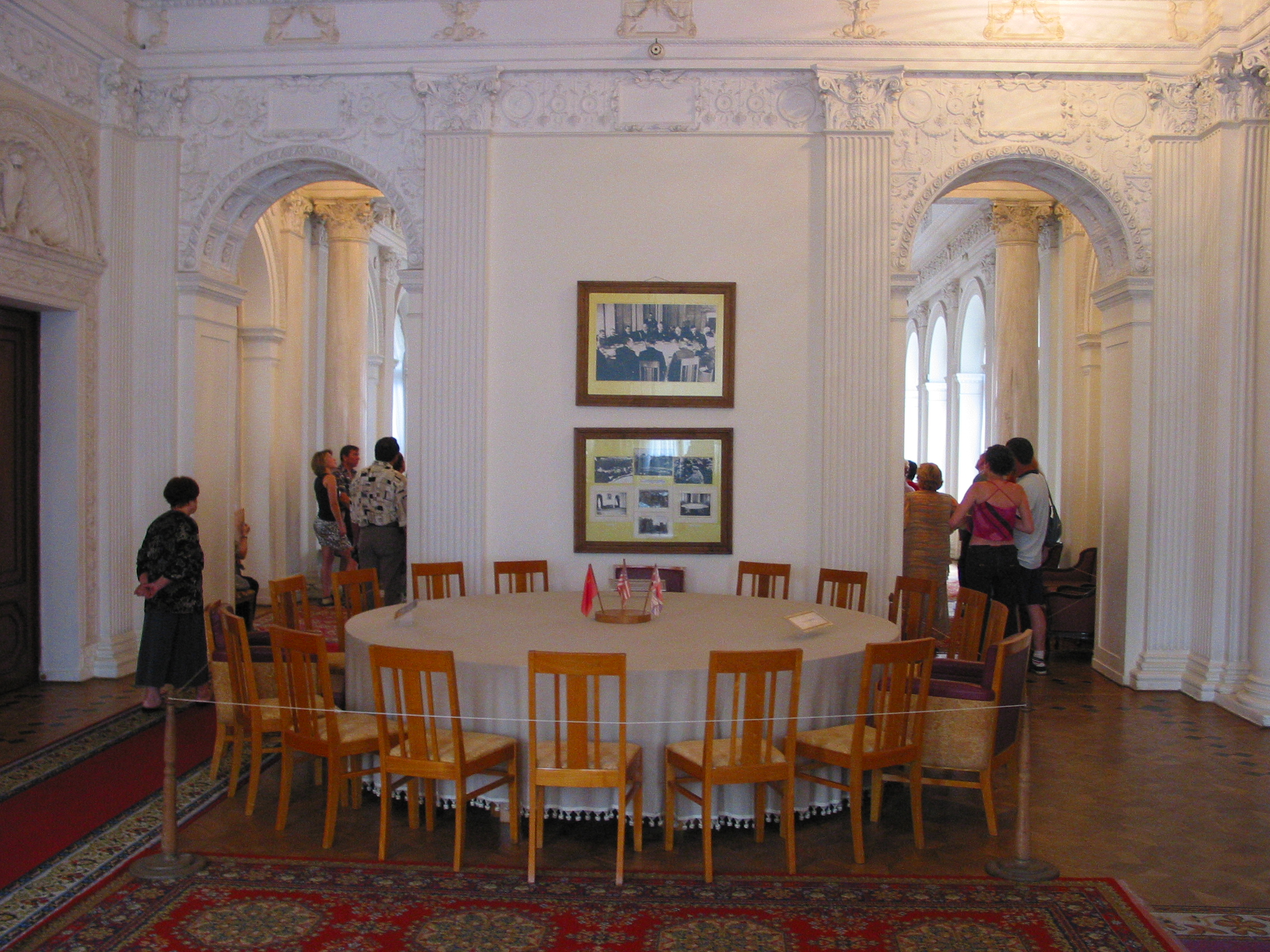
A Big Three meeting room

Furthermore, the Soviets agreed to join the United Nations because of a secret understanding of a voting formula with a veto power for permanent members of the Security Council, which ensured that each country could block unwanted decisions.

The Soviet Army had occupied Poland completely and held much of Eastern Europe with a military power three times greater than Allied forces in the West. The Declaration of Liberated Europe did little to dispel the sphere of influence agreements, which had been incorporated into armistice agreements.

All three leaders ratified the agreement of the European Advisory Commission setting the boundaries of postwar occupation zones for Germany with three zones of occupation, one for each of the three principal Allies. They also agreed to give France a zone of occupation carved out of the US and UK zones, but De Gaulle maintained the principle of refusing to accept that the French zone would be defined by boundaries established in his absence. He thus ordered French forces to occupy Stuttgart in addition to the lands earlier agreed upon as comprising the French occupation zone. He only withdrew when threatened with the suspension of essential American economic supplies. Churchill at Yalta then argued that the French also needed to be a full member of the proposed Allied Control Council for Germany. Stalin resisted that until Roosevelt backed Churchill's position, but Stalin still remained adamant that the French should not be admitted to full membership of the Allied Reparations Commission to be established in Moscow and relented only at the Potsdam Conference.

The Big Three agreed that all original governments would be restored to the invaded countries, with the exceptions of Romania, Bulgaria and Poland, whose government-in-exile was also excluded by Stalin.

An additional, highly consequential outcome of the conference was the signing of reciprocal repatriation agreements between the Big Three, which mandated the return of displaced persons and prisoners of war. In February 1945, these agreements were met with complete diplomatic consensus; the primary motivation for the Western Allies was securing the rapid, safe return of British and American servicemen being liberated from Nazi camps by the advancing Red Army. Under these protocols, any individuals identified as Soviet or Western nationals were subject to mandatory extradition regardless of personal consent. While signed as a routine logistical arrangement, the policy became deeply controversial during its post-war implementation, as the use of military force to execute blanket handovers, such as the forced repatriation of Cossack collaborators, led to mass panics, public outcries, and subsequent charges of Allied duplicity.

There were also discussions on the Middle East and the issue of Palestine, whereby Roosevelt supported the creation of a new Jewish state in Palestine, believing that it would be a model of social justice and would raise the standard of living in the region, over the opposition of King Ibn Saud of Saudi Arabia. Roosevelt cited the views of Walter C. Lowdermilk that Palestine could absorb many millions more people. Prior to the conference, Secretary of State Edward Stettinius Jr. urged Roosevelt not to make any decisions about Palestine without Soviet approval as they might use it to gain influence in the Middle East, and instead try to win agreement from the British and the Soviets on a policy that considered the interests of both Arabs and Jews and avoid uncritical support for Zionism. However, at the conference, Stalin did not object to Roosevelt's goals and Churchill gave informal support in exchange for refraining discussions on the White Paper of 1939.

=== Declaration of Liberated Europe ===
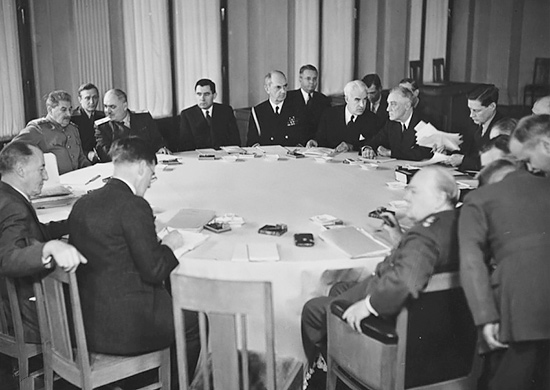
Leaders of the Big Three at the negotiating table at the Yalta conference

The Declaration of Liberated Europe was created by Winston Churchill, Franklin D. Roosevelt, and Joseph Stalin during the Yalta Conference. It was a promise that allowed the people of Europe "to create democratic institutions of their own choice". The declaration pledged "the earliest possible establishment through free elections governments responsive to the will of the people". That is similar to the statements of the Atlantic Charter for "the right of all people to choose the form of government under which they will live".

=== Key points ===
The key points of the meeting were as follows:

- Agreement to the priority of the unconditional surrender of Nazi Germany. After the war, Germany and Berlin would be split into four occupied zones.
- Stalin agreed that France would have a fourth occupation zone in Germany if it was formed from the American and the British zones.
- Germany would undergo demilitarization and denazification. At the Yalta Conference, the Allies decided to provide safeguards against a potential military revival of Germany, to eradicate German militarism and the Nazi general staff, to bring about the denazification of Germany, to punish the war criminals and to disarm and demilitarise Germany.
- German war reparations were partly to be in the form of forced labor. The forced labour was to be used to repair damage that Germany had inflicted on its victims. However, laborers were also forced to harvest crops, mine uranium, and do other work (see also Forced labor of Germans after World War II and Forced labor of Germans in the Soviet Union).
- Creation of a reparation council which would be located in the Soviet Union.
- The status of Poland was discussed. The recognition of the communist Provisional Government of the Republic of Poland, which had been installed by the Soviet Union "on a broader democratic basis", was agreed to.
- The Polish eastern border would follow the Curzon Line, and Poland would receive territorial compensation in the west from Germany.
- Stalin pledged to permit free elections in Poland.
- Roosevelt obtained a commitment by Stalin to participate in the United Nations.
- Stalin requested that all of the 16 Soviet Socialist Republics would be granted UN membership. That was taken into consideration, but 14 republics were denied; Roosevelt and Churchill agreed to membership for Ukraine and Byelorussia. While Roosevelt requested additional votes, with Churchill agreeing in principle and Stalin suggesting two addition votes so as to be equal to the Soviet Union, the United States ultimately did not request more than one vote.
- Stalin agreed to enter the fight against the Empire of Japan "in two or three months after Germany has surrendered and the war in Europe is terminated". As a result, the Soviets would take possession of Southern Sakhalin and the Kuril Islands, the port of Dalian would be internationalized, and the Soviet lease of Port Arthur would be restored, among other concessions.
- For the bombing of Japan, agreement was reached on basing U.S. Army Air Force B-29s near the mouth of the Amur River in the Komsomolsk-Nikolaevsk area (not near Vladivostok, as had earlier been proposed), but that did not eventuate. General Aleksei Antonov also said that the Red Army would take the southern half of Sakhalin Island as one of its first objectives and that American assistance to defend Kamchatka would be desirable.
- Nazi war criminals were to be found and put on trial in the territories in which their crimes had been committed. Nazi leaders were to be executed.
- Reciprocal repatriation agreements were signed.
- A "Committee on Dismemberment of Germany" was to be set up. Its purpose was to decide whether Germany was to be divided into several nations. Some examples of partition plans are shown below:
The eventual partition of Germany into Allied Occupation Zones:
British zone
French zone (two exclaves) and beginning in 1947, the Saar Protectorate
American zone, including Bremen
Soviet zone, later the GDR
Polish and Soviet annexed territory

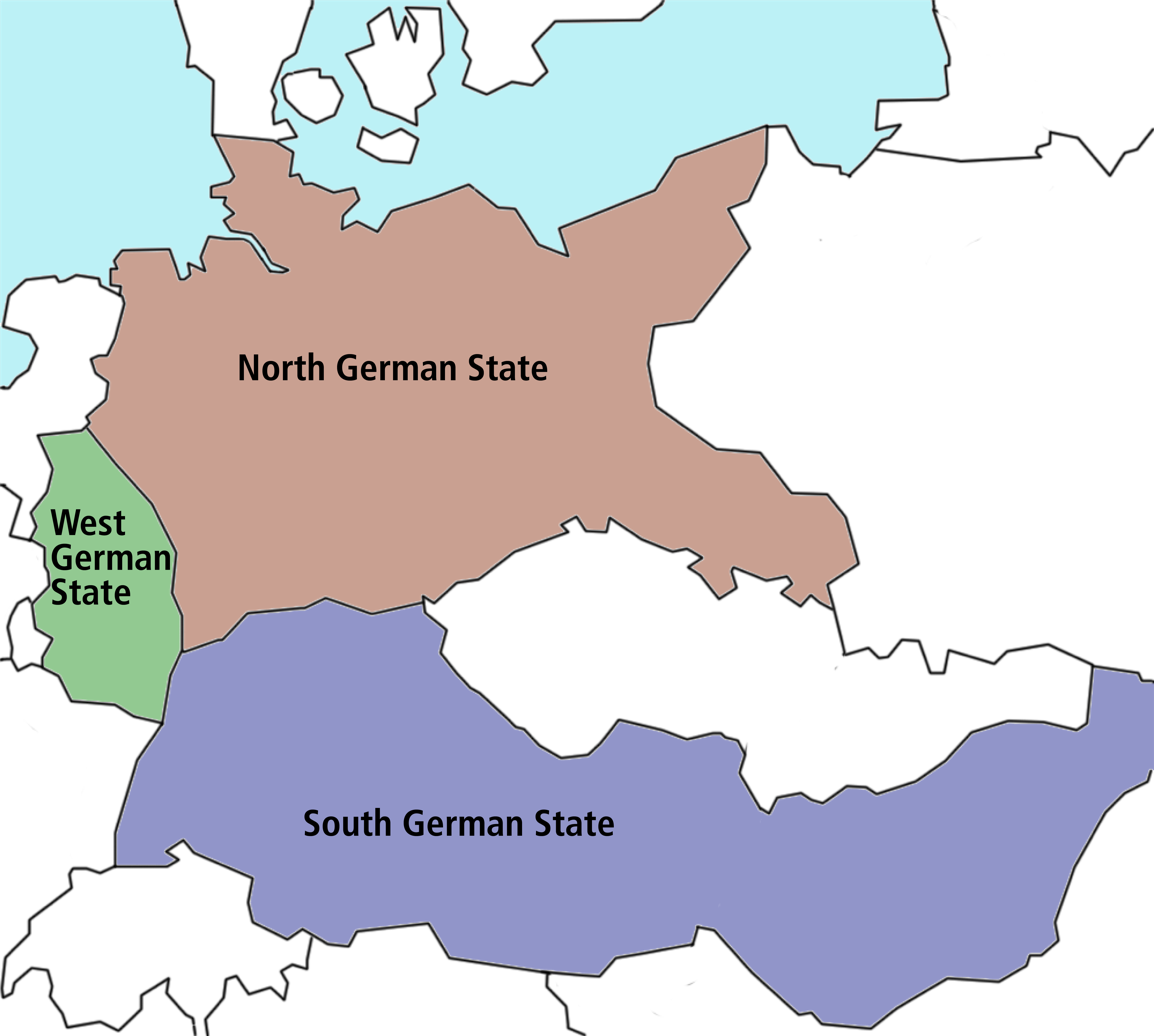
Partition plan from Winston Churchill:
North German state
South German state, including modern Austria and Hungary
West German state

Morgenthau Plan:
North German state
South German state
International zone
Territory lost from Germany (Saarland to France, Upper Silesia to Poland, East Prussia, partitioned between Poland and the Soviet Union)

=== Democratic elections ===
The Big Three further agreed that democracies would be established, all liberated European and former Axis satellite countries would hold free elections and that order would be restored. In that regard, they promised to rebuild occupied countries by processes that will allow them "to create democratic institutions of their own choice. This is a principle of the Atlantic Charter – the right of all peoples to choose the form of government under which they will live." The resulting report stated that the three would assist occupied countries to form interim government that "pledged to the earliest possible establishment through free elections of the Governments responsive to the will of the people" and to "facilitate where necessary the holding of such elections".

The agreement called on signatories to "consult together on the measures necessary to discharge the joint responsibilities set forth in this declaration". During the Yalta discussions, Molotov inserted language that weakened the implication of enforcement of the declaration.

Regarding Poland, the Yalta report further stated that the provisional government should "be pledged to the holding of free and unfettered elections as soon as possible on the basis of universal suffrage and secret ballot". The agreement could not conceal the importance of acceding to the pro-Soviet short-term Lublin government control and of eliminating language that called for supervised elections.

According to Roosevelt, "if we attempt to evade the fact that we placed somewhat more emphasis on the Lublin Poles than on the other two groups from which the new government is to be drawn I feel we will expose ourselves to the charges that we are attempting to go back on the Crimea decision". Roosevelt conceded that, in the words of Admiral William D. Leahy, the language of Yalta was so vague that the Soviets could "stretch it all the way from Yalta to Washington without ever technically breaking it".

The final agreement stipulated that "the Provisional Government which is now functioning in Poland should therefore be reorganized on a broader democratic basis with the inclusion of democratic leaders from Poland and from Poles abroad". The language of Yalta conceded predominance of the pro-Soviet Lublin government in a provisional government but a reorganized one.

== Aftermath ==
=== Eastern Bloc ===
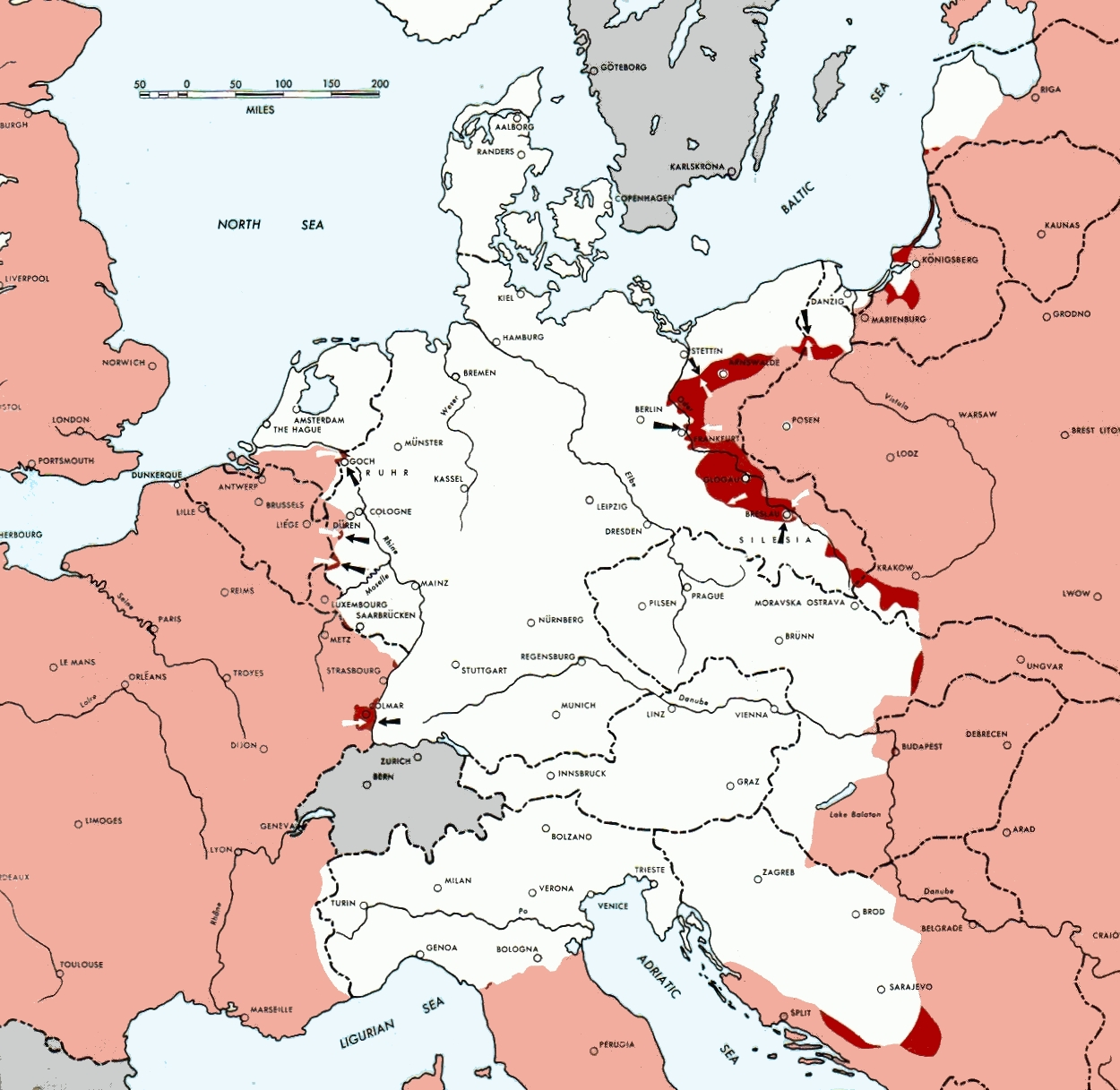
Allied-occupied territories (red) on 15 February 1945, four days after the end of the conference

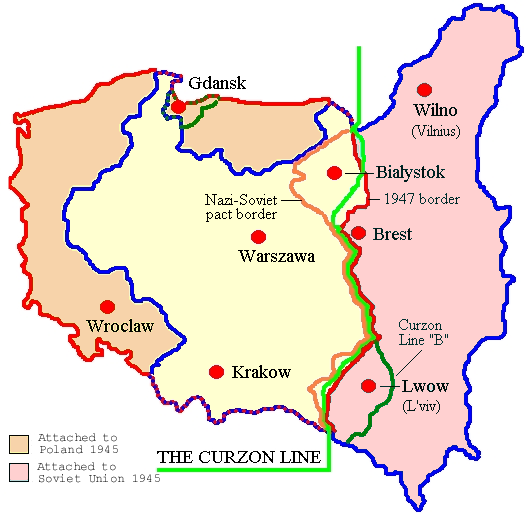
Poland's old and new borders, 1945 – Kresy in light red

Because of Stalin's promises, Churchill believed that he would keep his word regarding Poland and he remarked, "Poor Neville Chamberlain believed he could trust Hitler. He was wrong. But I don't think I am wrong about Stalin."

Churchill defended his actions at Yalta in a three-day parliamentary debate starting on February 27, which ended in a vote of confidence. During the debate, many MPs criticised Churchill and expressed deep reservations about Yalta and support for Poland, with 25 drafting an amendment protesting the agreement.

After the Second World War ended, a communist government was installed in Poland. Many Poles felt betrayed by their wartime allies. Many Polish soldiers refused to return to Poland because of the Soviet repressions of Polish citizens (1939–1946), the Trial of the Sixteen and other executions of pro-Western Poles, particularly the former members of the AK (Armia Krajowa). The result was the Polish Resettlement Act 1947, Britain's first mass immigration law.

On March 1, 1945, Roosevelt assured Congress, "I come from the Crimea with a firm belief that we have made a start on the road to a world of peace". However, the Western Powers soon realized that Stalin would not honour his promise of free elections for Poland. After receiving considerable criticism in London following Yalta regarding the atrocities committed in Poland by Soviet troops, Churchill wrote Roosevelt a desperate letter referencing the wholesale deportations and liquidations of opposition Poles by the Soviets. On March 11, Roosevelt responded to Churchill: "I most certainly agree that we must stand firm on a correct interpretation of the Crimean decision. You are quite correct in assuming that neither the Government nor the people of this country will support participation in a fraud or a mere whitewash of the Lublin government and the solution must be as we envisaged it in Yalta."

By March 21, Roosevelt's Ambassador to the Soviet Union, Averell Harriman, cabled Roosevelt that "we must come clearly to realize that the Soviet program is the establishment of totalitarianism, ending personal liberty and democracy as we know it". Two days later, Roosevelt began to admit that his view of Stalin had been excessively optimistic and that "Averell is right."

Four days later, on March 27, the Soviet People's Commissariat for Internal Affairs (NKVD) arrested 16 Polish opposition political leaders who had been invited to participate in provisional government negotiations. The arrests were part of a trick employed by the NKVD, which flew the leaders to Moscow for a later show trial, followed by sentencing to a gulag. Churchill thereafter argued to Roosevelt that it was "as plain as a pike staff" that Moscow's tactics were to drag out the period for holding free elections "while the Lublin Committee consolidate their power". The Polish elections, held on January 16, 1947, resulted in Poland's official transformation to a communist state by 1949.

Following Yalta, Soviet Foreign Minister Vyacheslav Molotov expressed worry that the Yalta Agreement's wording might impede Stalin's plans, Stalin responded, "Never mind. We'll do it our own way later." The Soviet Union had already annexed several occupied countries as (or into) Soviet Socialist Republics, and other countries in Central and Eastern Europe were occupied and converted into Soviet-controlled satellite states, such as the People's Republic of Poland, the People's Republic of Hungary, the Czechoslovak Socialist Republic, the People's Republic of Romania, the People's Republic of Bulgaria, the People's Republic of Albania, and later East Germany from the Soviet zone of German occupation. Eventually, the United States and the United Kingdom made concessions in recognizing the communist-dominated regions by sacrificing the substance of the Yalta Declaration although it remained in form.

==== Aborted enforcement plans ====
At some point in early 1945, Churchill had commissioned a contingency military enforcement operation plan for war on the Soviet Union to obtain "square deal for Poland" (Operation Unthinkable), which resulted in a May 22 report that stated unfavorable success odds. The report's arguments included geostrategic issues (a possible Soviet–Japanese alliance resulting in moving of Japanese troops from the Asian continent to the Home Islands, threat to Iran and Iraq) and uncertainties concerning land battles in Europe.

=== Potsdam Conference ===
The Potsdam Conference was held from July to August 1945, which included the participation of Clement Attlee, who had replaced Churchill as prime minister and President Harry S Truman (representing the United States after Roosevelt's death). At Potsdam, the Soviets denied claims that they were interfering in the affairs of Romania, Bulgaria and Hungary. The conference resulted in the Potsdam Declaration, regarding the surrender of Japan, and the Potsdam Agreement, regarding the Soviet annexation of former Polish territory east of the Curzon Line, provisions to be addressed in an eventual Final Treaty ending World War II, and the annexation of parts of Germany east of the Oder–Neisse line into Poland and of northern East Prussia into the Soviet Union.

=== American politics ===
Roosevelt's generous terms to Stalin, followed quite quickly by the start of the Cold War under Roosevelt's Vice President and successor, Harry Truman, meant that Yalta was often seen in a bad light in American public opinion, particularly among most shades of Republicans and more Conservative Democrats in the South and West as well as by many Americans with links to Eastern Europe. When Eisenhower was elected as President on the Republican ticket there were hopes that Yalta would be repudiated by the new Administration and the newly Republican Senate. Efforts were made by both the new Senate majority leader, Robert A. Taft, and Republican members of the Foreign Relations Committee, although this fizzled out after Stalin's death.

== See also ==
- Eastern Bloc
- Frank Roberts
- List of World War II conferences
- List of Soviet Union–United States summits
- History of the United Nations
- Percentages agreement
- Repatriation of Soviet citizens after World War II
  - Repatriation of Cossacks after World War II
  - Operation Keelhaul
- Western betrayal
- World War II Behind Closed Doors: Stalin, the Nazis and the West

== Sources ==
- Bethell, Nicholas (1974). The Last Secret: Forcible Repatriation to Russia, 1944–47. London: Andre Deutsch. ISBN 978-0-233-96613-7.
- Berthon, Simon; Potts, Joanna (2007), Warlords: An Extraordinary Re-creation of World War II Through the Eyes and Minds of Hitler, Churchill, Roosevelt, and Stalin, Da Capo Press, ISBN 978-0-306-81538-6
- Booker, Christopher (1997). A Looking-Glass Tragedy: The Controversy Over the Repatriations from Austria in 1945. London: Duckworth. ISBN 9780715627389.
- Black, Cyril E.; English, Robert D.; Helmreich, Jonathan E.; McAdams, James A. (2000), Rebirth: A Political History of Europe since World War II, Westview Press, ISBN 978-0-8133-3664-0
- Cook, Bernard A. (2001), Europe Since 1945: An Encyclopedia, Taylor & Francis, ISBN 0-8153-4057-5
- Ehrman, John (1956). Grand Strategy Volume VI, October 1944 – August 1945. London: HMSO (British official history). pp. 96–111.
- Grenville, John Ashley Soames (2005), A History of the World from the 20th to the 21st Century, Routledge, ISBN 978-0-415-28954-2
- LaFeber, Walter (1972), America, Russia, and the Cold War, John Wiley and Sons, ISBN 978-0-471-51137-3
- Miscamble, Wilson D. (2007), From Roosevelt to Truman: Potsdam, Hiroshima, and the Cold War, Cambridge University Press, ISBN 978-0-521-86244-8
- Polian, Pavel (2004). Against Their Will: The History and Geography of Forced Migrations in the USSR. Central European University Press. ISBN 978-9-639-24168-8.
- Roberts, Geoffrey (2006), Stalin's Wars: From World War to Cold War, 1939–1953, Yale University Press, ISBN 978-0-300-11204-7
- Truman, Margaret (1973), Harry S. Truman, William Morrow & Co., ISBN 978-0-688-00005-9
- Wettig, Gerhard (2008), Stalin and the Cold War in Europe, Rowman & Littlefield, ISBN 978-0-7425-5542-6
- Kennedy, David M. (2003), The American People in World War II Freedom from Fear, Part Two, Oxford University Press, ISBN 978-0-19-516893-8
