= National Anthem of Iran =

Anthem adopted in 1990

Sorud-e Melli-ye Jomhuri-ye Eslâmi-ye Erân
English: National Anthem of the Islamic Republic of Iran
- سرود ملی جمهوری اسلامی ایران
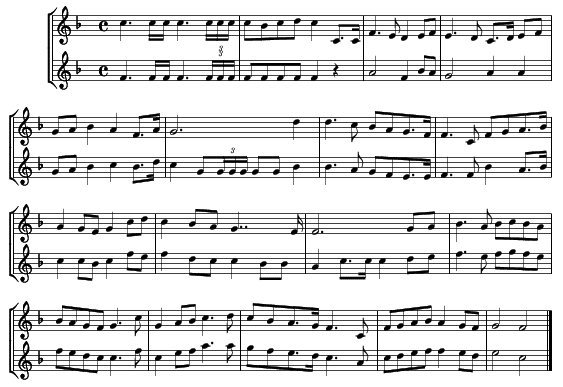
- Sheet music
- National anthem of Iran
- Lyrics: Sayed Bagheri, 1989
- Music: Hassan Riyahi, 1988
- Adopted: 1990
- Preceded by: "Payandeh Bada Iran"

Audio sample
- Official orchestral instrumental recording: file; help

The National Anthem of the Islamic Republic of Iran (Note: Persian: سرود ملی جمهوری اسلامی ایران, romanized: Sorud-e Melli-ye Jomhuri-ye Eslâmi-ye Erân; IPA: [soˈɾuːde melˈliːje d͡ʒomhuːˈɾiːje ʔeslɑːˈmiːje ʔiːˈɾɑːn]) was adopted in 1990, replacing the previous anthem used during the rule of Ruhollah Khomeini. It was composed by Hassan Riyahi, and the lyrics were written by Sayed Bagheri. It is the fourth national anthem of Iran overall.

== History ==
Due to the death of Supreme Leader Ruhollah Khomeini in 1989, Iran adopted its current anthem after a competition the following year. At the time of its adoption, it was the second shortest anthem in the world; the first being Japanese national anthem "Kimigayo" of seven lines.

== Lyrics ==
Official text in Persian

سر زد از افق مهر خاوران
فروغ دیده‌ی حق‌باوران
بهمن فر ایمان ماست
پیامت ای امام «استقلال، آزادی» نقش جان ماست
شهیدان پیچیده در گوش زمان فریادتان
پاینده مانی و جاودان
جمهوری اسلامی ایران

Romanization

Sar zad az ofoq mehr-e xāvarān
foruḡ-e dide-ye haq(q) bāvarān
Bahman farr-e Imān-e māst
Payāmat ey Emām "esteqlāl, āzādi" naqš-e jān-e māst
Šahidān pičide dar guš-e zamān faryādetān
Pāyande māni o jāvedān
Jomhuri-ye Eslāmi-ye Irān

IPA transcription

[sæɾ‿zæd ʔæz | ʔoˈfoɢ | ˈmeɦ.ɾe χɑː.ʋæˈɾɑːn |]
[foˈɾuː.ʁe diːˈde.je | hæɢ(ː) bɑː.ʋæˈɾɑːn ‖]
[bæɦˈmæn | ˈfær.re ʔiːˈmɑː.ne mɑːst ‖]
[pʰæˈjɑː.mæt ʔej ʔeˈmɑːm | ʔes.tʰeʁˈlɑːl | ʔɑː.zɑːˈdiː | ˈnæʁ.ʃe ˈd͡ʒɑː.ne mɑːst ‖]
[ʃæ.hiːˈdɑːn | pʰiː.t͡ʃʰiːˈde dæɾ ˈɡuː.ʃe zæˈmɑːn fæɾˌjɑː.deˈtʰɑːn ‖]
[pʰɑː.jænˈde | mɑːˈniː(.j‿)o d͡ʒɑː.ʋeˈdɑːn ‖]
[d͡ʒom.huːˈɾiː.je ʔes.lɑːˈmiː.je ʔiːˈɾɑːn ‖]

English translation

Upwards on the horizon rose the Eastern Sun
The light in the eyes of the Believers in Justice
Bahman (Note: The month in which the Iranian Revolution took place.) is the zenith of our faith.
Your message, O Imam, of Sovereignty and Freedom is imprinted on our souls
O Martyrs! Your shouts echo in the ears of time:
Be enduring, continuing, and eternal,
The Islamic Republic of Iran.

== See also ==
- Emblem of Iran
- Flag of Iran
- Imperial Anthem of Iran – former national anthem
- Royal Salute (anthem) – former national anthem
