= Fathollah Minbashian =

Iranian general (1916–2007)

Timsar Fathollah Minbashian
- فتح‌الله مین‌باشیان
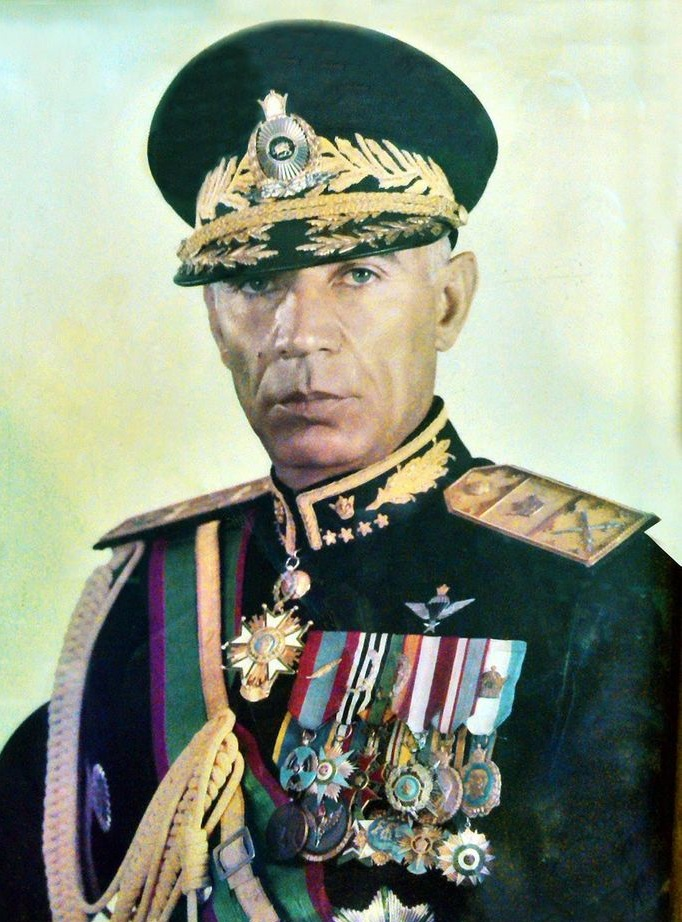
- General Minbashian in an undated photo
- Born: 7 August 1916; Tehran, Qajar Iran
- Died: 5 July 2007 (aged 90); Paris, France
- Education: Military Academy
- Relatives: Mehrdad Pahlbod (Brother)
- Military career
- Allegiance: Pahlavi Iran
- Branch: Ground Force
- Service years: 1936–1972
- Rank: General
- Commands: Imperial Iranian Ground Forces (1969–1972); Third Army in Fars (1965–1969); Mashhad Army (1961–1965); First Brigade of Tehran (1958–1961)
- Conflicts: World War II; Anglo-Soviet invasion of Iran; 1963 demonstrations in Iran; Joint Operation Arvand; Siahkal incident; Seizure of Abu Musa and the Greater and Lesser Tunbs

Fathollah Minbashian
Personal information
- Position: Goalkeeper

Senior career*
| Years | Team | Apps | (Gls) |
| 1945–1947 | Docharkheh Savaran | | |

International career
| 1941 | Iran | 1 | (0) |
- * Club domestic league appearances and goals

Fathollah Minbashian (7 August 1916 – 5 July 2007) was an Iranian general. He served in the Iranian army from 1938 to 1972, reaching the rank of four-star general as Commander of the Imperial Iranian Ground Forces (1969–1972), during the reign of Shah Mohammad Reza Pahlavi.

== Family ==
Fathollah Minbashian came from a family of military musicians, who contributed to the emergence of classical music in Iran. His grandfather Gholam Reza Minbashian (Salar Mo'azez) was a pioneer in the history of classical Western music in Iran. He is recognised as the first Iranian to have received an education in classical music, and to have studied music abroad, and whose work was published in Europe. He was also the first Iranian to have taught classical music in Iran, and he created Iran's first string orchestra. Among other compositions, Gholam Reza Minbashian wrote the music of the national anthem of Iran's Constitutionalist Revolution, entitled "Sublime State of Iran" (Dowlat-e 'Aliyye-ye Irān - دولت علیّه ایران). Fathollah Minbashian's father, Nasrollah Minbashian, entered the Saint Petersburg Conservatory at 13, for a period of seven years. On returning to Iran, he joined the Persian Cossack Brigade, in which he served throughout is career, finally reaching the rank of Brigadier General. Nasrollah succeeded his father (Gholam Reza) at the head of the army's musical orchestra, while also directing its music school. Nasrollah Minbashian held these posts until 1935, while teaching several instruments which he had mastered: the piano, the violin, the cello. Fathollah Minbashian's uncle Gholam-Hossein Minbashian (1907–1980) studied at the Stern Conservatory in Berlin and Geneva. He was a pupil of Robert Mendelsohn. On returning to Iran in 1932, he joined the Military Academy, and took on the directorship of the music conservatory music in 1934. He founded and directed Iran's first symphony orchestra, the "Baladieh" orchestra, the Tehran Symphony Orchestra.

== Early life and education ==
Fathollah Minbashian attended a Zoroastrian school until the age of 14. In Part 1 of his military memoires, he describes his patriotic fervour, which in 1930 led him to volunteer to go to the military high school (Madrasseh Nezam), against his father's wishes. He remained there until 1936. From high school onwards and throughout this period he played football, becoming the first goalkeeper of Iran's national team "Tadj", for ten years and so acquired great popularity.

== Advanced studies in the United States and Iran ==
Fathollah Minbashian was 20 years old when he entered the Military Academy (Daneshgadeh Afsari) in the same class as Mohammad Reza Pahlavi, Iran's Crown Prince. He left it as an officer in 1938, coincidentally the day of his father's death. Between 1938 and 1940, he was an officer cadet and then second-lieutenant, commanding the NCOs’ training school. In 1944 he became a lieutenant, and he then passed the exam for the US Army Infantry School at Fort Benning, and having been promoted captain, he went to the United States with his wife. At the end of his studies, Fathollah Minbashian returned to Iran, entering War School. He graduated top of his class, and became a major. He returned to the United States in 1951, as the Americans had qualified him to go to their war school, the Command and General Staff College of the US Army at Fort Leavenworth, Kansas. Again, he was top of his class, and he was offered to join the US army, but refused and returned to Iran.

In 1970, while on an official visit to the United States as Commander of the Imperial Iranian Ground Forces, General Minbashian received the US Legion of Merit.

== Military career and military operations ==
Once in Iran again, he devoted his career to building up a modern army. According to several officers' testimonies reported in the Nima monthly journal in August 2007 (including the Shah's former Chief of Staff General Fereydoun Djam), two objectives guided his military thinking throughout his life: the defence of the Persian Gulf because he rightly feared invasion of Iran by Iraq, and the provision of a decent life for the army's soldiers and NCOs, usually from very modest backgrounds. He has also been acknowledged for having contributed to the modernisation of Iran's ground forces.

In 1954, he was promoted to colonel at the head of Iran's Military Academy where he developed new methods of instruction, based especially on "management by motivation". He reorganised the academy and student discipline, and having become a brigadier general in 1958, he was appointed to the command of the First Brigade of Tehran.

In 1961, he was appointed commander of the Mashhad Army with the rank of major general. He was therefore stationed in the holy city of Mashhad during the 1963 demonstrations. According to French Wikipedia, these protests were critical of the Shah's reformist White Revolution which in particular ended feudal landownership in Iran as part of a land reform programme, and gave women the right to vote. In Part 2 of his military memoirs (Section 35), Minbashian recounts the arrest of Ayathollah Qomi who was responsible for disorders in Mashad. According to Minbashian's account, he received the order to arrest Qomi and send him to Tehran, and he described how he organised this arrest "without any bloodshed, and without the least deployment force or military action".

In 1965, he was promoted to lieutenant general, and Commander of the Third Army in Fars. Summoned by the Shah, he was ordered to provide the army's logistical support to the regional Gendarmerie in the arrest of Bahman Gashgai. The latter had become the leader of a rebellion of the tribes in Fars, against the Shah's land reforms. Gashgai was accused of having killed eight gendarmes. According to his own account, Minbashian advocated using anti-guerrilla tactics based on “military civic action”. In Section 38 of his military memoires, he recounts the context of this arrest and the strategy put in place so that the rebels laid down their arms and surrendered of their own will. This strategy consisted, first, of cutting the rebels off from their sources of supply, and secondly, from carrying out civic actions among tribal peoples to improve their living conditions and to get them to dissociate themselves from rebels. Being isolated, and following negotiations with the Minister of the Court of the Shah, Assadollah Alam, Bahman Gashgai surrendered himself to Alam, on the condition his life would be spared. Alam then accompanied Gashgai to Tehran, yet later handed him over to the Gendarmerie. They in turn put Gashgai on trial and executed him for the murders of eight gendarmes. A cousin of Bahman Gashgai and a comrade in arms, Iraj Kashkouli, gave an account of their saga in his own memoirs. Here he said that he “suspected” Minbashian of having had a role in this execution. Minbashian always denied this, stating that the army under his command played no role in the execution. His task had only been to provide logistical assistance to the Gendarmerie, the only actors in the field. Minbashian specified that during his entire military career none of his missions “led to the slightest bloodshed”.

== Joint Operation Arvand Rud ==
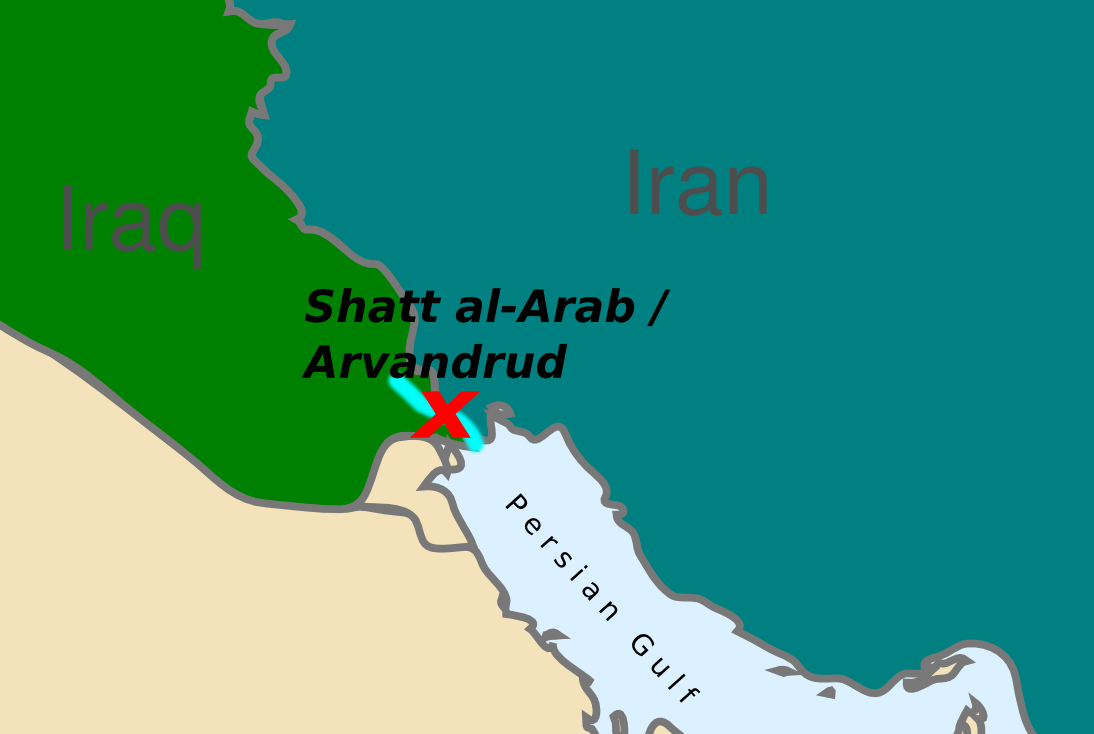
Location of incident

In April 1969, while he was Commander of the Imperial Ground Forces, Minbashian was assigned to deal with border tensions with Iraq, which, had they degenerated could have set the entire region ablaze, as history subsequently showed. Joint Operation Arvand Rud was conducted by Iran's three armed services: the navy, the air force and the army, under the command General Minbashian, who recounts the details of this operation in his military memoirs.

The conflict arose out of a decision by Mohammad Reza Shah to stop paying tolls to Iraq for the use of Arvand Rud river to the Persian Gulf, and so access the sea for Iranian ships, under a treaty signed in 1937, drafted in the light of British influence, and which favoured Iraq. This river traces a border of 200 km between the two countries, and its width varies between 200 and 800 meters. The Iranian cities of Abadan and Khorramshahr (with their oil installations) and the Iraqi city of Basra are located along the river. Iraq claimed sovereignty over the river (called Shatt al-Arab in Arabic) and threatened to block the passage of ships not flying the Iraqi flag.

Minbashian organised a show of military force to intimidate the Iraqis. He personally overflew the river in a helicopter, entering Iraqi airspace, at risk to his life, to show that he would not retreat under any circumstances, threatening the Iraqi forces amassed along the river with retaliation if they opened fire.

Thus, on 22 April 1969, the Iranian merchant ship Ebn-e-Sina bearing the Iranian flag and escorted by two warships of the Imperial Navy under the command of Captain Ataï, and a squadron F4 Phantom jets of Imperial Airforce under the command of General Nader Jahanbani (a highly distinguished Iranian fighter pilot) passed down the river for six hours, to the Persian Gulf, without any resistance by Iraqi forces. The 1937 treaty was thus abrogated and Iran took control of its side of the Arvand Rud.

== Relieved from command ==
In 1971, Fathollah Minbashian learned of his forced retirement as Commander of the Imperial Ground Forces through the press. This decision of the Shah of Iran to dismiss him was variously commented, and can be explained by a combination of three factors. The first was based on an analysis given by Alidad Mafinezam and Aria Mehrabi in Iran and Its Place Among Nations, in which the authors explain that one of the weaknesses of the Shah was his personal insecurity and inability to delegate responsibilities, especially military, to the high dignitaries of his army. The fact of having removed the three pillars that formed the military backbone of his regime (General Minbashian, Commander of the Ground Forces; General Jam, Chief-of-Staff; and the accidental death of General Khatami, the Air Force Commander) during the decade preceding the Revolution in 1979, was (according to these authors), a decisive factor in the downfall of the regime. These three generals were military professionals, highly educated and experienced, as well as being genuine patriots who had a high opinion of their roles and refused to be puppets or valets. The Shah envied their popularity and their competence: "one of the Shah's key weaknesses was his abiding envy toward eminence in others, even among his military's top brass, who constituted the backbone of his regime".

The second factor leading to Fathollah Minbashian's dismissal was his constant concern and insistence with the Shah about creating a decent life for the soldiers and the non-commissioned officers of the army, from poor backgrounds. Various commentators including the Minister of the Court of Shah Mr. Asadollah Alam, reported a dispute between Minbashian and Finance Minister Jamshid Amouzegar during winter of 1970 about increases in military spending, including the possibility of sending officers and NCOs to Western hospitals when care was not available in Iran. Minbashian allegedly stated that what he was asking for was a mere drop in the ocean of the luxurious spending by Princess Ashraf (the Shah's influential twin sister).

The third, most important factor was Minbashian's opposition to the fatalism concerning "tie-in contracts" imposed by Western arms’ sellers. On this subject, Minbashian related in much detail his row with the British Chief-of-Staff, three days before his dismissal. This dispute concerned the purchase and maintenance of British Chieftain tanks by the Iranian army, and the loss of £60 million Minbashian caused to the British, because Minbashian claimed that the British were in breach of contract by not maintaining the tanks which had become inoperable.

Later, Minbashian stated on numerous occasions that he had been sacked by the Shah for his professionalism, his straight talking, and because of British pressure as he threatened their arms transactions and economic interests in Iran.

== Sports and cultural activities ==
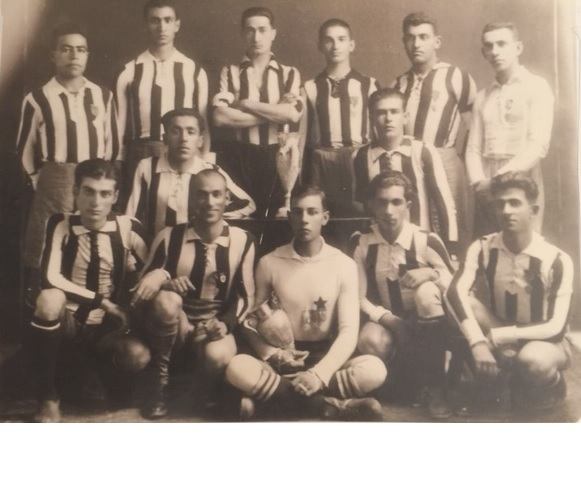
National team with F. Minbashian seated holding trophy

He had practiced soccer in his youth quasi-professionally as he was the first and very popular goalkeeper of the national football team of Iran. He played as a goalkeeper for Docharkheh Savaran and the Iran national team. In 1942, he was in the Iran national football team which defeated the British Army XI Football team in a friendly game by 1–0. Fathollah Minbashian practiced many other sports including swimming, the horseback riding, tennis and skiing. In the 1960s, he even published a self-teaching ski guide (Khod amouz eeski) comprising many diagrams.

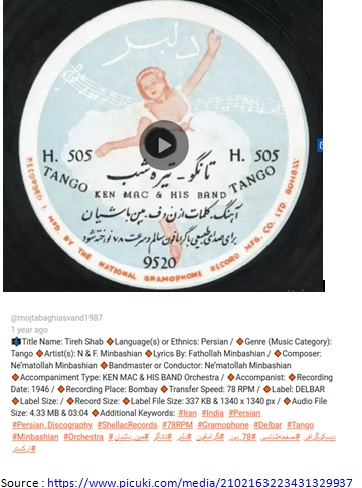
Delbar record label

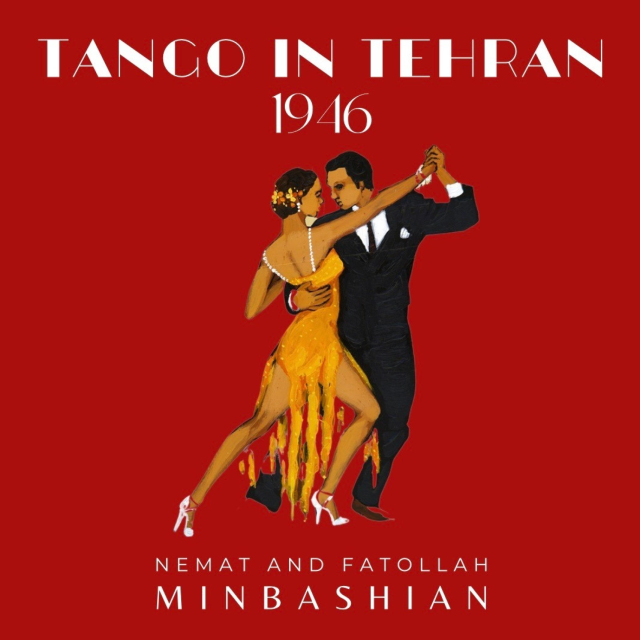
Tango in Tehran 1946, by Nemat and Fathollah Minbashian

Like his two brothers Nemat and Ezatollah (who changed his name to Mehrdad Pahlbod when he married one of the Shah's sisters) Fathollah Minbashian was fond of music. An amateur violinist and poet, he was also a cinephile. He had a great passion for films by Norman Wisdom and Fernandel, which he dubbed in Persian. Together with his brother Nemat, he wrote the first Iranian tangos and had them recorded on vinyl records. These were released by the private Persian record label "Delbar", and were recorded and manufactured in Mumbai (formerly Bombay). Some of his poems have been adapted to music by his nephew Sepehr and sung by his sister Anvar. These tangos have been published on YouTube, Spotify and Apple by Minbashian's nephew Dara Minbashian (son of Nemat), who is himself a songwriter.

His love for the Persian civilisation was expressed spectacularly during the festive military parade that were part of international celebrations of the 2,500-year celebration of the Persian Empire, a parade he organised with his brother Mehrdad Pahlbod, who was Minister of Culture. This parade used the costumes and musical instruments of Cyrus the Great's Achaemenid.

== Years in exile ==
General Minbashian left Iran in 1972 after his dismissal at the age of 55, and moved to France. He turned down the Shah's subsequent offer to appoint him as an Ambassador, as well as some private business proposals.

In 1981, following the start of the Iran–Iraq War launched by Saddam Hussein, a strong sense of patriotism prompted him to send a long telegram to the head of the Iranian armed forces to offer his services, as he knew by heart every inch of the border between the two countries, and as he had much planned an Iranian repost against a possible invasion by Iraq. The Islamic Republic of Iran replied to his offer by publishing in the newspaper Mizan (dated 13 November 1980) a "summons by the Revolutionary Court to report to Evin Prison to answer the charge of having worked for the loss of the country’s wealth in favour of foreign powers". Ironically, the Islamic Tribunal thus invoked exactly the opposite reason for which he was fired by the Shah, namely that he had resisted foreign interests operating in Iran.

This made him a political refugee in France, where he suffered a pulmonary embolism, followed a number of years later by a stroke, which left him condemned to his room for the last 15 years of his life. He died on 5 July 2007, and is buried in the Montparnasse Cemetery in Paris.

== Bibliography ==
- Jasim M. Abdulghani, Iraq and Iran (RLE Iran A). Taylor & Francis. (2012). p. 121. ISBN 9781136834264.
- The Advocate-Messenger,"Iranian Ship Challenges Iraq Estuary", p. 16, 27 April 1969, consulted 26 October 2017.
- Gholam Reza Afkhami, The life and times of the Shah, University of California Press, 2009.
- Asadollah Alam, Diaries, Vol VI (1355-1356/1976/1977) [Persian language] (English and Arabic Edition).
- BBC Persian, Press release by BBC, biography of General Fathollah Minbashian.
- James Buchan, Days of God, The Revolution in Iran and Its Consequences, London, John Murray (Publishers), 2012.
- Alidad Mafinezam and Aria Mehrabi, Iran and its place among nations-pillars of nation building and regional stability. Westport Conn, London, Praeger, 2008.
- Fathollah Minbashian, Military memoirs, Interview recorded by Dr Habib Ladjevardi, 1st December 1981, Cagnes-Sur-Mer, France. Iranian Oral History Collection, Harvard University.
- Habibollah Nassirifar, The Men of Traditional Music and Modern Iran, 1993, Sanani, حبیباللهٔ نصیری فرـ مردان موسیقی سنتی و نوین ایران چاپ اول سال ۱۳۷۲.
- Nima, "Biography and hommage to General Fathollah Minbashian", No 158, 15 August 2007, - نیما شمار۱۵۸ه مرداد ماه ۱۳۸۶.
- Sadjad Pourghanad, Gholam Reza Khan Minbashian, a pioneer in Iranian music, translated by Mahboube Khalvati, 01/10/2019.
- Rahavard Persian Journal Jahangir Shamsavari, 7 July 2007, consulted 15 March 2021.
- Ali Taghipour, History of the Music Conservatory in Iran 1918-2018, limited edition published for the centenary of the Music Conservatory, Tehran, 2018,اریخ موسیقی هنرستان ۱۲۹۷ـ ۱۳۹۷ علی تقی پور چاپ سال۱۳۹۷.
- "Dialogue With General Hassani Sadi", in Negin-e-Iran (in Persian), 3 (9): 8–40, Summer 2004, archived.
- Nikolas Stürchler, The Threat of Force in International Law, Cambridge University Press. (2007). p. 202. ISBN 9781139464918.
- Charles P. Wallace: "Iran, Iraq Still Fail to Bridge Waterway Dispute", in The Los Angeles Times, 19 August 1988, consulted 15 March 2021.
- Steven R. Ward, Immortal: A Military History of Iran and Its Armed Forces, Updated Edition Georgetown University Press. (2014). p. 202. ISBN 9781626160651.
