= IRFE =

- Instituto Regional Federico Errázuriz is a primary and secondary school in Santa Cruz, Chile.
- IRFE - French fashion house from the beginning of the 20th century.
