= Gholam Reza Minbashian =

Iranian composer (1861–1835)

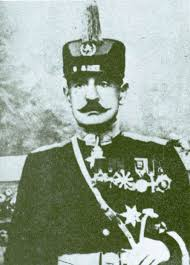
Gholam Reza Minbashian, 1920s

Gholam-Reza Minbashian, also known as Salar-e Mo’azzaz (Persian: غلامرضا مین‌باشیان; 1861–1935) was an Iranian composer and conductor of State Military Band in Tehran. Gholam-Reza Minbashian is recognised as the first Iranian to have received an education in classical music abroad and the first Iranian composer whose work (Avaz-e Mahour for piano) was published in Europe. Among other compositions, he composed a national march for the liberation of Tehran.

== Education ==
Gholam Reza Minbashian was the son of Nasrollah, an electrical engineer, and of Qamar al-Zaman, possibly the first woman in Iran to play the piano. He was born in 1861 in Tehran, Qajar Iran. He studied music at Tehran's Polytechnic, known as Dar al-Fonun, the first higher education institution in Iran where music was the subject of academic education. There he was a student of the French musician Alfred Jean Baptiste Lemaire for eight years, while also completing his studies at the military academy, graduating as an officer and deputy to Lemaire as head of the Music Department. Gholam Reza was decorated by Naser al-Din Shah Qajar.

In 1898, at 37, Gholam Reza moved to the Russian Empire with his son (named Nasrollah after his father) to complete his training at the Conservatory of Saint Petersburg. He enrolled his 13-year-old son there, while he himself followed classes by Rimsky-Korsakov for two years. On returning to Tehran, he was assigned to the Persian Cossack Brigade, which was led by Russians at the time. He was the Brigade’s music director.

== Musical influence in Iran ==
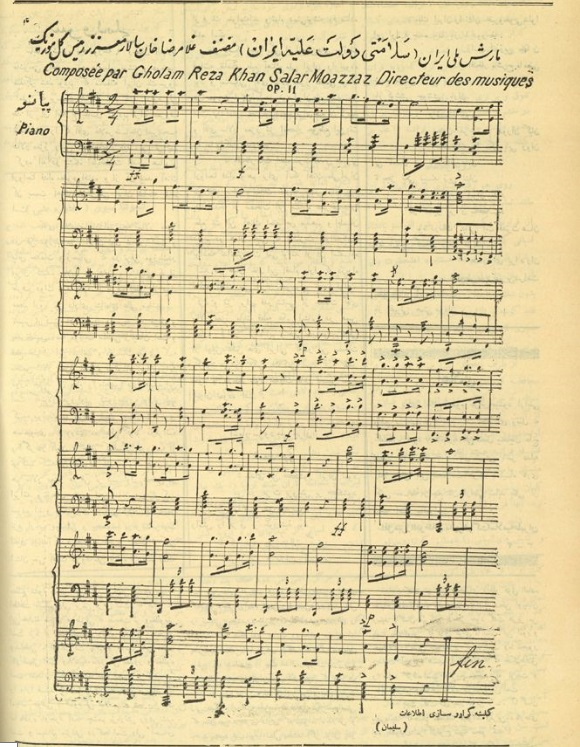
Anthem of the Constitutionalist Revolution by Gholam Reza Minbashian

With the unfolding of the Constitutionalist Revolution, he left the Brigade, whose despotism he denounced, and moved to France. In 1912, he returned to Iran to receive the rank of brigadier general and take charge of the army’s royal orchestra. He was granted the title of Salar Mo'azaz, a royal title of the Qajar dynasty given to great statesmen. Gholam Reza received several distinctions, including the diamond medal, and he taught the piano to Ahmad Shah Qajar. In 1921, he created the Army’s Music Department while also becoming the director of the Department of Music of Dar ul-Funun. He was in charge of the department with his son Nasrollah until 1928. A composer, he was the first to transcribe Iranian music into European notes. He composed the first national anthem of constitutionalist Iran.

He was also the first to introduce singing classes in primary schools. National anthems were composed by his son Nasrollah, based on lyrics from the works of the poets Saadi and Ferdowsi. Gholam Reza Minbashian retired in 1931 and died in 1935 at the age of 74. He is buried in Qom.

== Head of a family of musicians ==
Gholam Reza had a strong influence on his seven children. He encouraged two of his sons, Nasrollah and Gholam-Hossein, to follow advanced studies in music, in renowned conservatories.

Nasrollah (1885–1938) went to the Conservatory in Saint Petersburg, at the age of 13, for a period of seven years. On returning to Iran, he joined the Cossack Brigade and stayed there, finally reaching the rank of Brigadier General. He succeeded his father at the head of the army’s musical orchestra, while also directing its music school. He was given the title "Nasrosoltan" by Mozaffar ad-Din Shah Qajar. He held these posts until 1935, while teaching several instruments which he had mastered: the piano, the violin, the cello.

Gholam-Hossein (1907–1978) studied at the Stern Conservatory in Berlin and Geneva. He was a pupil of Robert Mendelsohn. On returning to Iran in 1932, he joined the Military Academy, took on the directorship of the music conservatory in 1934. He founded and conducted Iran’s first symphony orchestra, the “Baladieh” orchestra.

Gholam Reza also had three grandsons who played musical instruments: Fathollah the violinist, Nemat the pianist who also studied conducting, and Ezatollah the cellist. Fathollah and Nemat Minbashian composed the first Iranian tangos, while Ezatollah became Iran’s first Minister of Culture during the Pahlavi era. Known as Mehrdad Pahlbod by then, he founded the Tehran Opera, Talar-e Rudaki, and contributed to the renaissance of Iranian folk song and dance. Fathollah Minbashian (by then a full General and Head of Iran's Imperial Ground Forces) and Ezatollah supervised the military parade of re-enacted Achaemenid armies during the ceremonies of the 2,500-year celebration of the Persian Empire in Persepolis in 1971.

The great grandson of Gholam Reza, Sepehr is a musician. He has also written a novel "A Hundred Sweet Promises" based on a story of Nasrollah Minbashian's life and his travel to Russia.

== Sources ==
- Majaleh-ye Musighi [Music Magazine), Vol. 1, Tehran, 1940.
- Khaleghi, Rouhollah. History of Persian Music. Ibn-e Sina Publications, Tehran, 1956.
- Mallah, Hossein-Ali. Military Music in Persia. Majaleh-ye Musighi, Vol. 3, No. 139, May 1973.
- Shabani, Aziz. History of Music from Cyrus to Pahlavi. Fars Printing House, Shiraz, 1973.
- Safai, Ebrahim. History of Tehran Conservatory of Music. Ministry of Culture, Tehran, 1977.
