= Ebrahim Azhang =

Ebrahim Azhang ابراهیم آژنگ
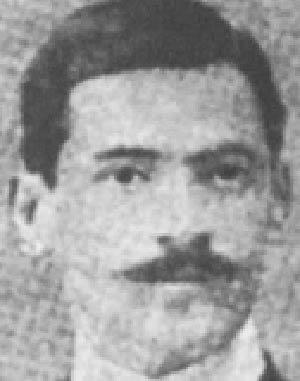

Background information
- Also known as: ابراهیم آژنگ, Ebrahim Ajang, Ibrahim Azhang
- Genres: Persian traditional music
- Occupation(s): Composer, instrumentalist

Ebrahim Azhang (Persian: ابراهیم آژنگ, also transliterated as Ebrahim Ajang) was a composer from Iran of Iranian classical dastgah music during the Qajar period.

== Life ==
He was a student of the French composer Alfred Jean Baptiste Lemaire and a colleague of Darvish Khan. He primarily played the violin. He composed many Pishdaramads and Rengs which are still popular among classical Iranian musicians. He taught at the Dar ul-Funun school.
