= Salute of the Sublime State of Persia =

National anthem of Iran between 1909 and 1933

Salāmati-ye Dowlat-e 'Aliyye-ye Irān
English: Salute of the Sublime State of Persia
- سلامتی دولت علیه ایران
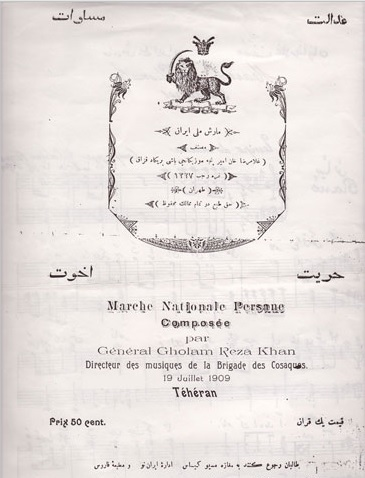
- Former national anthem of Qajar Iran and Pahlavi Iran
- Music: Gholamreza Khan Amirpanjeh, 1909
- Adopted: 1909/1914
- Relinquished: 1933
- Preceded by: Royal Salute
- Succeeded by: Imperial Anthem of Iran

Audio sample
- Salute of the Sublime State of Persia: file; help

"Salute of the Sublime State of Persia" (Persian: سلامتی دولت علیه ایران, romanized: Salāmati-ye Dowlat-e 'Aliyye-ye Irān) was the national anthem of Iran between 1909 and 1933. It replaced the earlier anthem, "Royal Salute", during the Persian Constitutional Revolution and served as Iran's national anthem until it was replaced by "Imperial Anthem of Iran" in 1933.

== History ==
The sheet music for the anthem was first published as the "National March of Iran" (French: Marche Nationale Persane) on 9 July 1909, a few days after the entrance of the constitutionalists into Tehran. The anthem was played at the coronation of Ahmad Shah Qajar in 1914, and its sheet music was published in the newspaper Asr-e Jadid in 1915.

This anthem was replaced with Imperial Anthem of Iran during the reign of Reza Shah.

In 2015, Persian composer Peyman Soltani used the music of this anthem for his song "Motherland" (Persian: سرزمین مادری, romanized: Sarzamine Mādari), which began with the lyrics:

عشقِ من ای سرزمین مادری (Eshq-e man ey sarzamin-e madari)

My love, oh my beloved motherland,

جان ریشه کرد در میانِ خاکِ تو (Jan rishe kard dar miyan-e khak-e to)

Life is rooted amid thy domain

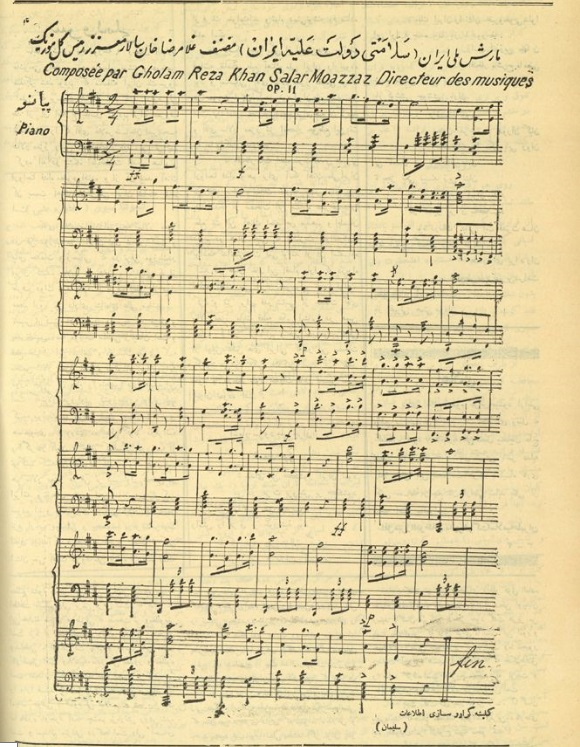
Sheet music as published in "Asr-e Jadid" newspaper

== Official lyrics ==
Perso-Arabic script

تا خدایْ این کشورِ ایران نمود
بس درِ عزت به رویش برگشود
خسروانش را کُلَه خورشید بود
رایتش را فرق بر خورشید بود
تا که خود چترِ عدالت گسترد
خود چترِ عدالت گسترد
مُلکِ ایران را نشانِ خیر و خوبی بُد لِوا
این لِوا فرخنده بادا باز با دورِ بقا
راست اندرین جهان
افتخارِ ما، شرحِ مامَضیٰ
شرحِ مامَضیٰ تا کی‌ام راست
باز کوششی جوششی یاران

چون به فرخ‌رسمِ دورانِ کیان
مُلکِ ملت را یکی یابی روان
بی‌تأمل باز باید داد جان
تا به‌جز نیکی نبیند زین نشان
هر که در تقدیرِ ایران بنگرد
در تقدیرِ ایران بنگرد
بود در مُلکِ کیان آیتِ قدرت عیان
باد با تاجِ کیانی رایتِ عزت به پا
هان ای برادران
موطنِ عزیز بهترین سراست
حفظِ خاکِ آن آبرویِ ماست
باز غیرتی همتی مردان

Literal English translation

As long as God looks upon this country of Iran
Many gates of honor opened to it
Its monarchs had crowns of the sun
Its banner had the sun at its center
Until it itself spread the canopy of justice
It itself spread the canopy of justice
The realm of Iran had a standard that was a sign of goodness and virtue
May this standard be blessed and endure through the span of eternity
True in this world
Our pride is the account of the past
As long as the account of the past remains true
Again the striving and ardor of companions

When by the auspicious custom of the Kayan era
The realm and the nation are found one in spirit
Without hesitation one must again give life
So that from this emblem nothing but goodness is seen
Whoever looks upon the destiny of Iran
Whoever contemplates the destiny of Iran
In the land of the Kayan there was a manifest sign of power
May the banner of honor be raised with the Kiani crown
O brothers
Our beloved homeland is the finest dwelling
Preserving its soil is our honor
Once more the zealous resolve of men
