= Rakitny =

Rakitny (Russian: Ракитный; masculine), Rakitnaya (Ракитная; feminine), or Rakitnoye (Ракитное; neuter) is the name of several inhabited localities in Russia.

== Urban localities ==
- Rakitnoye, Belgorod Oblast, a work settlement in Rakityansky Settlement Okrug of Rakityansky District, Belgorod Oblast

== Rural localities ==
- Rakitny, Chelyabinsk Oblast, a settlement in Krasnooktyabrsky Selsoviet of Varnensky District of Chelyabinsk Oblast
- Rakitny, Kemerovo Oblast, a settlement in Chkalovskaya Rural Territory of Leninsk-Kuznetsky District of Kemerovo Oblast
- Rakitny, Rostov Oblast, a khutor under the administrative jurisdiction of Zernogradskoye Urban Settlement of Zernogradsky District, Rostov Oblast
- Rakitnoye, Amur Oblast, a selo in Novoalexeyevsky Rural Settlement of Ivanovsky District of Amur Oblast
- Rakitnoye, Bagrationovsky District, abandoned settlement in Bagrationovsky District of Kaliningrad Oblast
- Rakitnoye, Zelenogradsky District, a settlement in Krasnotorovsky Rural Okrug of Zelenogradsky District of Kaliningrad Oblast
- Rakitnoye, Kaluga Oblast, a village in Sukhinichsky District of Kaluga Oblast
- Rakitnoye, Khabarovsk Krai, a selo in Khabarovsky District of Khabarovsk Krai
- Rakitnoye, Orenburg Oblast, a settlement in Krasnomayaksky Selsoviet of Sol-Iletsky District of Orenburg Oblast
- Rakitnoye, Primorsky Krai, a selo in Dalnerechensky District of Primorsky Krai
- Rakitnoye, Voronezh Oblast, a settlement in Volenskoye Rural Settlement of Novousmansky District of Voronezh Oblast
- Rakitnaya, a village in Uzkinsky Selsoviet of Znamensky District of Oryol Oblast

== See also ==
- Rokytne, several places in Ukraine
