= Mehrdad Pahlbod =

Iranian politician (1917–2018)

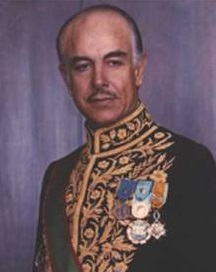
- Pahlbod c. 1977
- Born: Ezatollah Minbashian; 16 March 1917; Tehran, Sublime State of Iran
- Died: 9 August 2018 (aged 101); Los Angeles, California, U.S.
- Spouse: Shams Pahlavi (m. 1945; died 1996)
- Issue: Shahbaz Pahlbod; Shahyar Pahlbod; Shahrzad Pahlbod
- Father: Nasrollah Minbashian

Minister of Culture
- In office 7 March 1964 – 27 August 1978
- Monarch: Mohammad Reza Pahlavi
- Prime Minister: Hassan Ali Mansur; Amir-Abbas Hoveyda; Jamshid Amouzegar

Personal details
- Education: University of Lausanne

Mehrdad Pahlbod (Persian: مهرداد پهلبد; 16 March 1917 – 9 August 2018) was an Iranian politician who served as the first culture minister of Iran from 1964 until 1978.

== Early life ==
Pahlbod was born Ezatollah Minbashian (Persian: عزت‌الله مین‌باشیان) on 16 March 1917 in Tehran to Nasrollah Minbashian, a military officer who served as deputy director of the Imperial Iranian Army Band Corps. His grandfather, Gholam-Hossein Minbashian, a professional violinist, was the conductor of Tehran City Hall Symphony Orchestra and served for many years as the director of the Tehran Conservatory of Music. As a result of this background, Pahlbod grew up playing the violin, later graduating from Firooz Bahram High School. His brother was Fathollah Minbashian.

== Career ==
Pahlbod studied architecture in Switzerland at the University of Lausanne. In 1956 he became the vice president of the Persian Fine Arts Administration in Tehran, which later became the Iranian Ministry of Culture. Until 1961, he served as a deputy at the Ministry of Education. Between March 1964 and January 1965, Pahlbod was the deputy prime minister of Hassan Ali Mansur. He was also the minister for culture and the arts between 1965 and 1978.

== Personal life ==
Pahlbod was the second husband of Princess Shams Pahlavi. During a trip to Egypt in the 1950s, the couple secretly converted to Catholicism from Shia Islam. They had two sons and one daughter.

In the years following the Iranian Revolution, Pahlbod and his wife lived in exile in Santa Barbara, California. His wife passed away from cancer in 1996. Pahlbod was living in Los Angeles when he died on 9 August 2018 at the age of 101.
