= Payandeh Bada Iran =

Former Iranian national anthem (1980–1990)

پاینده بادا ایران
English: Be forever, an eternal Iran
- The emblem of Iran, adopted two months after the creation of the anthem.
- Former national anthem of Iran
- Lyrics: Abolghasem Halat, 1980
- Music: Mohammad Biglaripur, 1980
- Adopted: 24 March 1980
- Relinquished: 1990
- Preceded by: "Ey Iran" (de facto); Long Live our King of Kings (de jure)
- Succeeded by: "National Anthem of the Islamic Republic of Iran"

Audio sample
- Instrumental recording: file; help

"Payandeh Bada Iran" (Note: English: /ˌpɑːjænˈdeɪ ˈbɑːdə ɪˈrɑːn/ PAH-yan-DAY BAHD-ə ih-RAHN; Persian: پاینده بادا ایران, romanized: Pâyande Bâdâ Irân, lit. 'Be forever, an eternal Iran', pronounced [ˌpʰɒːjænˈde bɒːˈdɒː ʔiːˈɹɒːn]) was the national anthem of Iran between 1980 and 1990. It was adopted during the establishment of the Islamic Republic after the overthrow of the Pahlavi dynasty. The anthem's music was composed by Mohammad Biglaripur, and its lyrics were written by Abolghasem Halat. The anthem was replaced in 1990 with the "National Anthem of the Islamic Republic of Iran".

== Lyrics ==
Persian original

Persian script

شد جمهوری اسلامی به پا
که هم دین دهد هم دنیا به ما
از انقلاب ایران دگر
کاخ ستم گشته زیر و زبر
تصویر آینده (Note: Alternatively آیندۀ) ما، نقش مراد ماست
نیروی پاینده‌ی (Note: Alternatively پایندۀ) ما، ایمان و اتحاد ماست
یاریگر ما دست خداست
ما را در این نبرد او رهنماست

برگردان:
در سایه ی (Note: Alternatively سایۀ) قرآن جاودان
پاینده بادا ایران

آزادی چو گل‌ها در خاک ما
شکفته شد از خون پاک ما
ایران فرستد با این سرود
رزمندگان وطن را درود
آیین جمهوری ما، پشت و پناه ماست
سود سلحشوری ما، آزادی و رفاه ماست
شام سیاه سختی گذشت
خورشید بخت ما تابنده گشت

برگردان

Latin script

Shod Jomhuri-ye Eslâmi be pâ
Ke ham din dahad ham donyâ be mâ
Az Enqelâb-e Irân degar
Kâkh-e setam gashte zir o zebar
Tasvir-e âyande-ye mâ, naqsh-e morâd-e mâst
Niru-ye pâyande-ye mâ, Imân o Ettehâd-e mâst
Yârigar-e mâ dast-e Khodâst
Mâ râ dar in nabard u rahnamâst

Bargardân:
Dar sâye-ye Qorân jâvedân
Pâyande bâdâ Irân!

Âzâdi cho golhâ dar khâk-e mâ
Shekofte shod az khun-e pâk-e mâ
Irân ferestâd bânin sorud
Razmandegân-e Vatan râ dorud
Âyin-e Jomhuri-ye mâ, posht o panâh-e mâst
Sud-e salahshuri-ye mâ, âzâdi o refâh-e mâst
Shâm-e siyâh-e sakhti gozasht
Khorshid-e bakht-e mâ tâbande gasht

Bargardân

IPA transcription

[ʃod ˌd͡ʒom.huːˈɹiː‿je ˌʔes.lɒːˈmiː be pʰɒː |]
[kʰe hæm ˈdiːn dæˈɦæd hæm donˈjɒː be mɒː |]
[ʔæz ˌʔeɴ.ɢeˈlɒːb‿e ʔiːˈɹɒːn deˈgæɹ |]
[ˈkʰɒːx‿e seˈtʰæm ˈgæʃtʰ‿e ˈziːɹ‿o zeˈbæɹ ǀ]
[tʰæsˈviːɹ‿e ˌʔɒː.jænˈde‿je mɒː | ˈnæxʃ‿e moˈɹɒːd‿e mɒː ‖]
[niːˈɹuː‿je ˌpʰɒː.jænˈde‿je mɒː | ʔiːˈmɒːn‿o ˌʔet.tʰeˈɦɒːd‿e mɒː |]
[ˌjɒː.ɹiːˈgæɹ‿e mɒː ˈdæstʰ‿e xoˈdɒːst |]
[mɒː‿ɹɒː dæɹ ʔiːn næˈbæɹd‿uː ˌɹæɦ.næˈmɒːst |]

[ˌbæɹ.gæɹˈdɒːn]
[dæɹ sɒːˈje‿je ɢoɹˈʔɒːn ˌd͡ʒɒː.veˈdɒːn |]
[ˌpʰɒː.jænˈde bɒːˈdɒː ʔiːˈɹɒːn ǁ]

[ˌʔɒː.zɒːˈdiː t͡ʃʰo golˈhɒː dæɹ ˈxɒːkʰ‿e mɒː |]
[ˌʃe.kʰofˈtʰe ʃod ʔæz ˈxuːn‿e ˈpʰɒːkʰ‿e mɒː |]
[ʔiːˈɹɒːn ˌfe.ɹesˈtʰæd bɒː ʔiːn soˈɹuːd |]
[ɹæzˌmæn.deˈgɒːn‿e væˈtʰæn‿ɹɒː doˈɹuːd |]
[ʔɒːˈjiːn‿e ˌd͡ʒom.huːˈɹiː‿je mɒː | ˈpʰoʃtʰ‿o pʰæˈnɒːɦ‿e mɒːst ǁ]
[ˈsuːd‿e sæˌlæh.ʃuːˈɹiː‿je mɒː | ʔɒː.zɒːˈdiː‿o ɹeˈfɒːɦ‿e mɒːst |]
[ˈʃɒːm‿e siːˈjɒːɦ‿e sæxˈtʰiː goˈzæʃt |]
[xoɹˈʃiːd‿e ˈbæxtʰ‿e mɒː ˌtʰɒː.bænˈde gæʃt |]

[ˌbæɹ.gæɹˈdɒːn]

English translation

The Islamic Republic has been established,
Giving us the Faith and the World.
Through the Iranian Revolution
The palace of oppression has been overturned.
Our future's image is the role of our desire.
Our enduring power is our faith and unity.
Our helper is the hand of God.
He is our guide in this battle.

Chorus:
Under the shadow of the Quran
Be forever, an eternal Iran!

Freedom, like flowers in our soil
Blossomed with our pure blood
Iran sends with this anthem
Salute to the warriors of the fatherland
Our Republic's religion is our supporter and shelter
Profit of our bravery is our freedom and welfare
The dark night of adversity has passed
The sun of our fortune has begun glowing

Chorus
