= Princess Irina Alexandrovna of Russia =

Princess of Russia (1895–1970)

Princess Irina Alexandrovna
- Princess Felix Yusupova
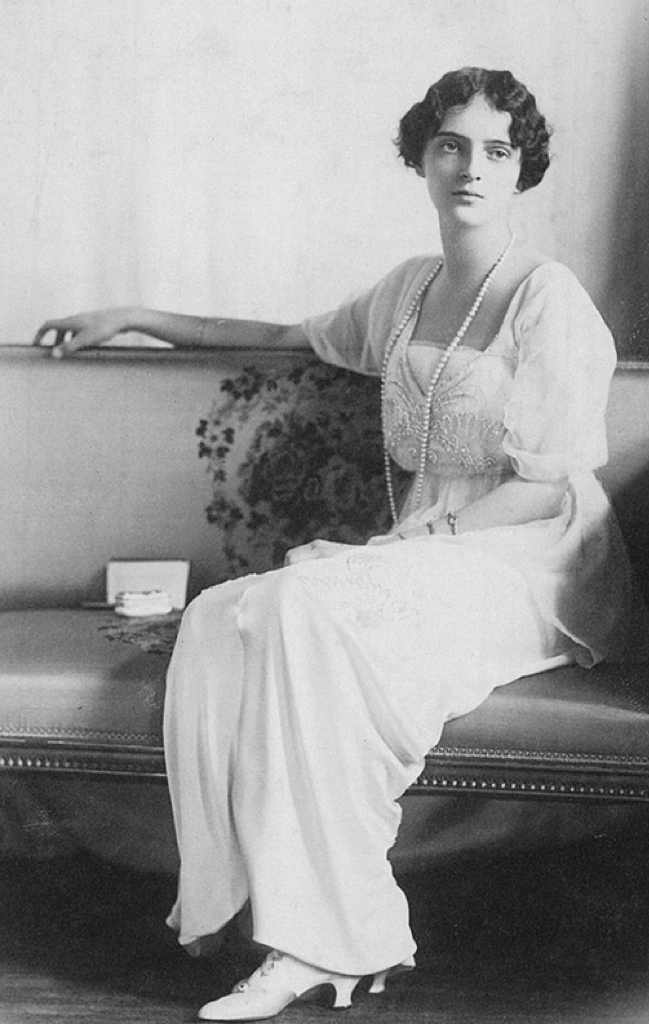
- Princess Irina in 1913
- Born: 15 July 1895; Farm Palace, Peterhof, Saint Petersburg, Russian Empire
- Died: 26 February 1970 (aged 74); Paris, France
- Burial: Sainte-Geneviève-des-Bois Russian Cemetery
- Spouse: Prince Felix Felixovich Yusupov (m. 1914; died 1967)
- Issue: Princess Irina Felixovna Yusupova
- House: Holstein-Gottorp-Romanov
- Father: Grand Duke Alexander Mikhailovich of Russia
- Mother: Grand Duchess Xenia Alexandrovna of Russia

Princess Irina Alexandrovna of Russia (Russian: Ирина Александровна; 15 July [O.S. 3 July] 1895 – 26 February 1970) was the only daughter and eldest child of Grand Duke Alexander Mikhailovich and Grand Duchess Xenia Alexandrovna of Russia. She was the first grandchild of Tsar Alexander III and the only biological niece of Tsar Nicholas II. Irina was married to the wealthiest man in Imperial Russia, Prince Felix Felixovich Yusupov. Her husband was one of the men who in 1916 murdered Grigori Rasputin, "holy healer" to Irina's hemophiliac cousin, Tsarevich Alexei Nikolaevich.

== Early life ==
Before her marriage on 22 February [O.S. 9 February] 1914, Irina, the eldest child and only daughter in a family of seven children, was considered one of the most elegant women in Imperial Russia. Her family had spent long periods living in the south of France beginning in about 1906 because of her father's political disagreements with the Tsar.

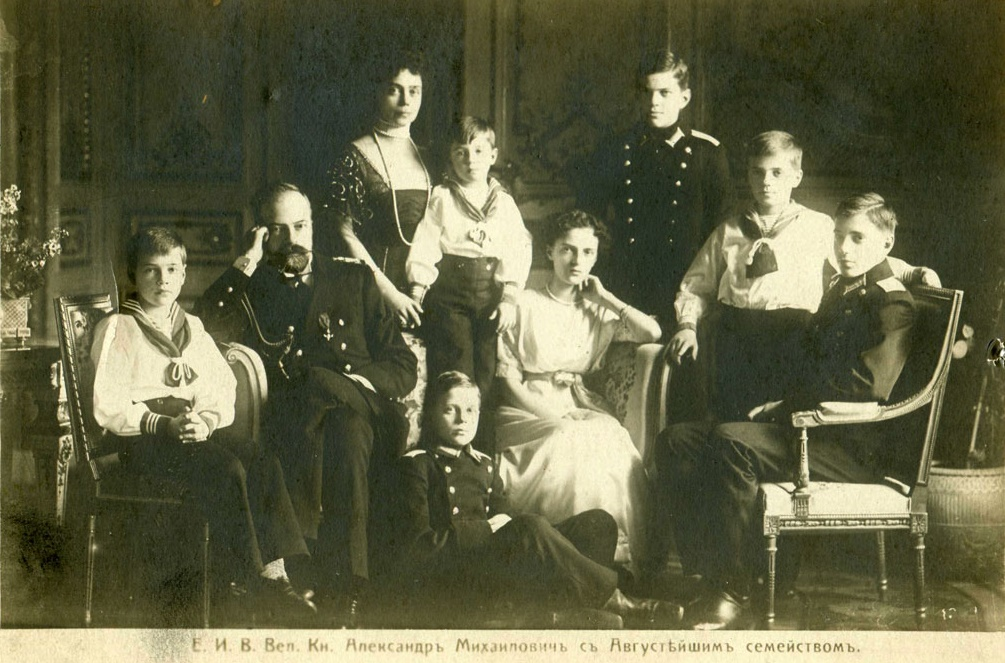
Princess Irina with her parents and brothers as a teenager.

Irina's father, Grand Duke Alexander Mikhailovich, was carrying on an affair with a woman in the south of France and often asked her mother for a divorce, which she refused to grant him. Her mother, Grand Duchess Xenia Alexandrovna, enjoyed extramarital affairs as well. Irina's parents tried to hide their unhappy marriage from their seven children, and Irina had a happy childhood. Irina was often called Irène, the French version of her name, or Irene, the English version. Her mother sometimes nicknamed her "Baby Rina." The Romanovs, heavily influenced by the French and English, spoke French better than Russian and often used the foreign versions of their first names to refer to each other.

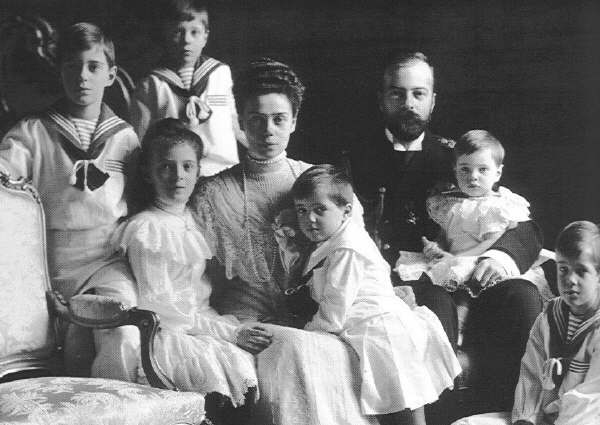
Princess Irina with her parents and brothers

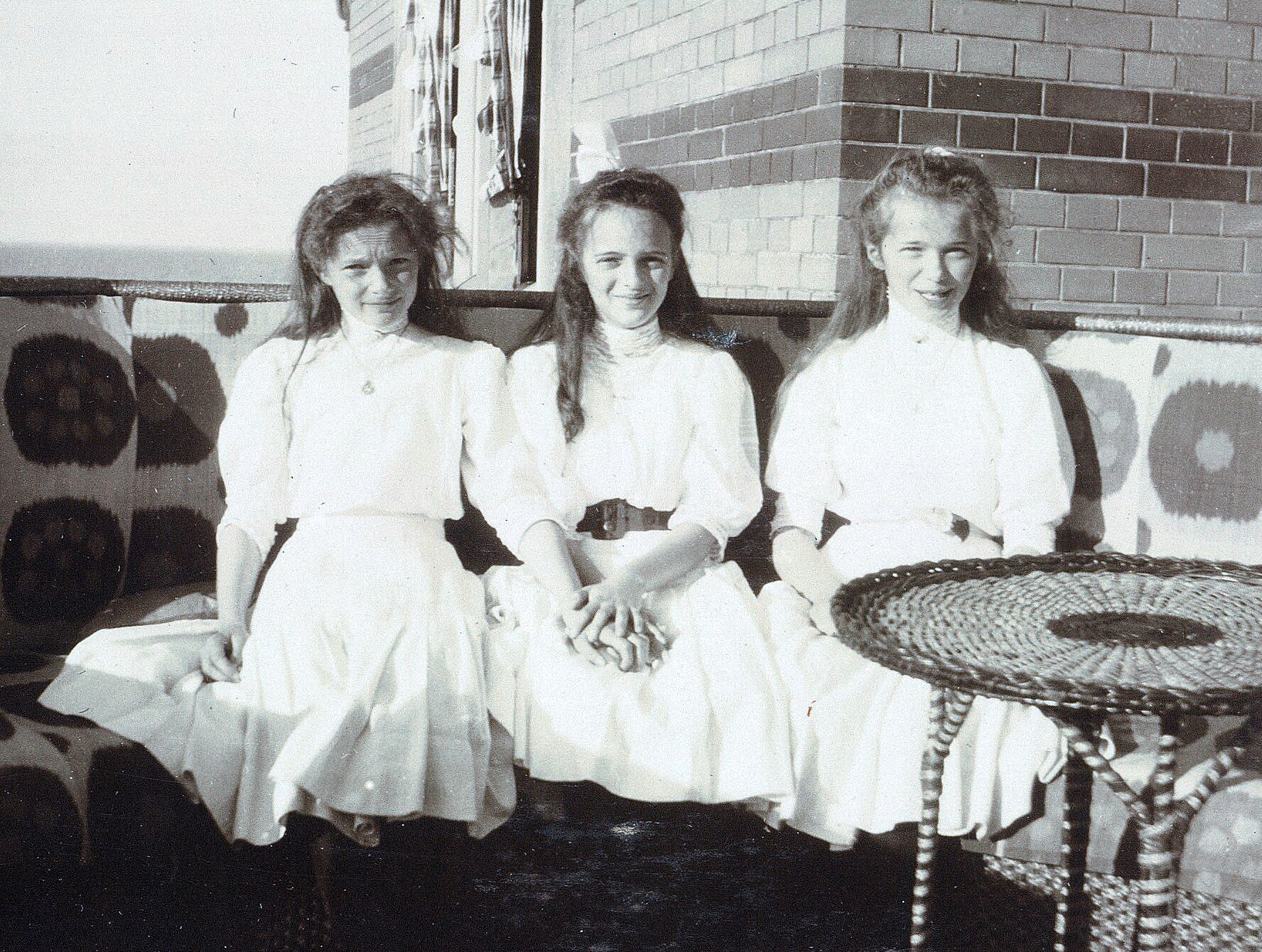
Princess Irina, center, with her cousins, Grand Duchess Tatiana, left, and Grand Duchess Olga, right, ca. 1909

== Marriage ==
Her husband-to-be, Felix Yusupov, was a man from a very wealthy family who enjoyed dressing in women's clothing and had sexual relationships with both men and women, scandalizing society, but he was also genuinely religious and willing to help others even when his own financial circumstances were reduced. At one point, in a fit of enthusiasm, he planned to give all his riches to the poor in imitation of his mentor, Grand Duchess Elizabeth Feodorovna. "Felix's ideas are absolutely revolutionary," a disapproving Tsarina Alexandra Feodorovna once said. He was persuaded not to do so by his mother, Zenaida, who said he had a duty to marry and continue the family line because he was her only surviving son. The future murderer of Rasputin also had a horror of the bloodshed and violence of war.

Felix, being bisexual, was not certain if he was "fit for marriage." Still, he was drawn to Irina and her icon-like beauty when he first encountered her. "One day when I was out riding I met a very beautiful girl accompanied by an elderly lady. Our eyes met and she made such an impression on me that I reined in my horse to gaze at her as she walked on," he wrote in his memoirs. One day in 1910, he was paid a visit by Grand Duke Alexander Mikhailovich and Grand Duchess Xenia Alexandrovna and was happy to discover the girl he had seen on the riding trail was their only daughter, Irina. "This time I had plenty of time to admire the wondrous beauty of the girl who was eventually to become my wife and lifelong companion. She had beautiful features, clear-cut as a cameo, and looked very like her father." He renewed his acquaintance with Irina in 1913 and was even more drawn to her. "She was very shy and reserved, which added a certain mystery to her charm.... Little by little, Irina became less timid. At first her eyes were more eloquent than her conversation but, as she became more expansive, I learned to admire the keenness of her intelligence and her sound judgment. I concealed nothing in my past life from her, and, far from being perturbed by what I told her, she showed great tolerance and comprehension." Yusupov wrote that Irina, perhaps because she had grown up with so many brothers, showed none of the artifice or lack of honesty that had put him off relations with other women.

Although Irina was understanding about Yusupov's wild past, her parents were not. When her parents and maternal grandmother Dowager Empress Maria Feodorovna heard the rumours about Felix, they wanted to call off the wedding. Most of the stories that they heard had originated from Grand Duke Dmitri Pavlovich of Russia, Irina's first cousin once removed, who had been one of Felix's friends and, it has been speculated, might have been involved in a romantic relationship with Felix. Dmitri told Felix he was also interested in marrying Irina, but Irina said she preferred Felix. Felix was able to persuade Irina's reluctant family to relent and allow the ceremony to go forward.

However, neither he nor Irina appeared to have objected to the morganatic terms of the marriage: "All members of the dynasty who married someone not of royal blood were obliged to sign a document renouncing their rights to the throne. Although Irina was very distant in the line of succession, she had to comply with this regulation before marrying me; but it did not seem to worry her very much." It was the society wedding of the year and the last such occasion in Russian society before World War I. Irina wore a 20th-century dress rather than the traditional court dress in which other Romanov brides had married, as she was a princess of the Imperial House, not a Grand Duchess. She wore a diamond and rock-crystal tiara that had been commissioned from Cartier and a lace veil that had belonged to Marie Antoinette. Guests at the wedding commented on what an attractive couple Felix and Irina made: "What an amazing couple–they were so attractive. What bearing! What breeding!" said one guest.

Irina was given away by her uncle, Nicholas II, and his wedding present to her was a bag of 29 uncut diamonds, ranging from three to seven carats. Irina and Felix also received a large assortment of precious gems from other wedding guests. They later managed to take many of these gems out of the country following the Russian Revolution of 1917 to use them to provide a living in exile.

== World War I ==
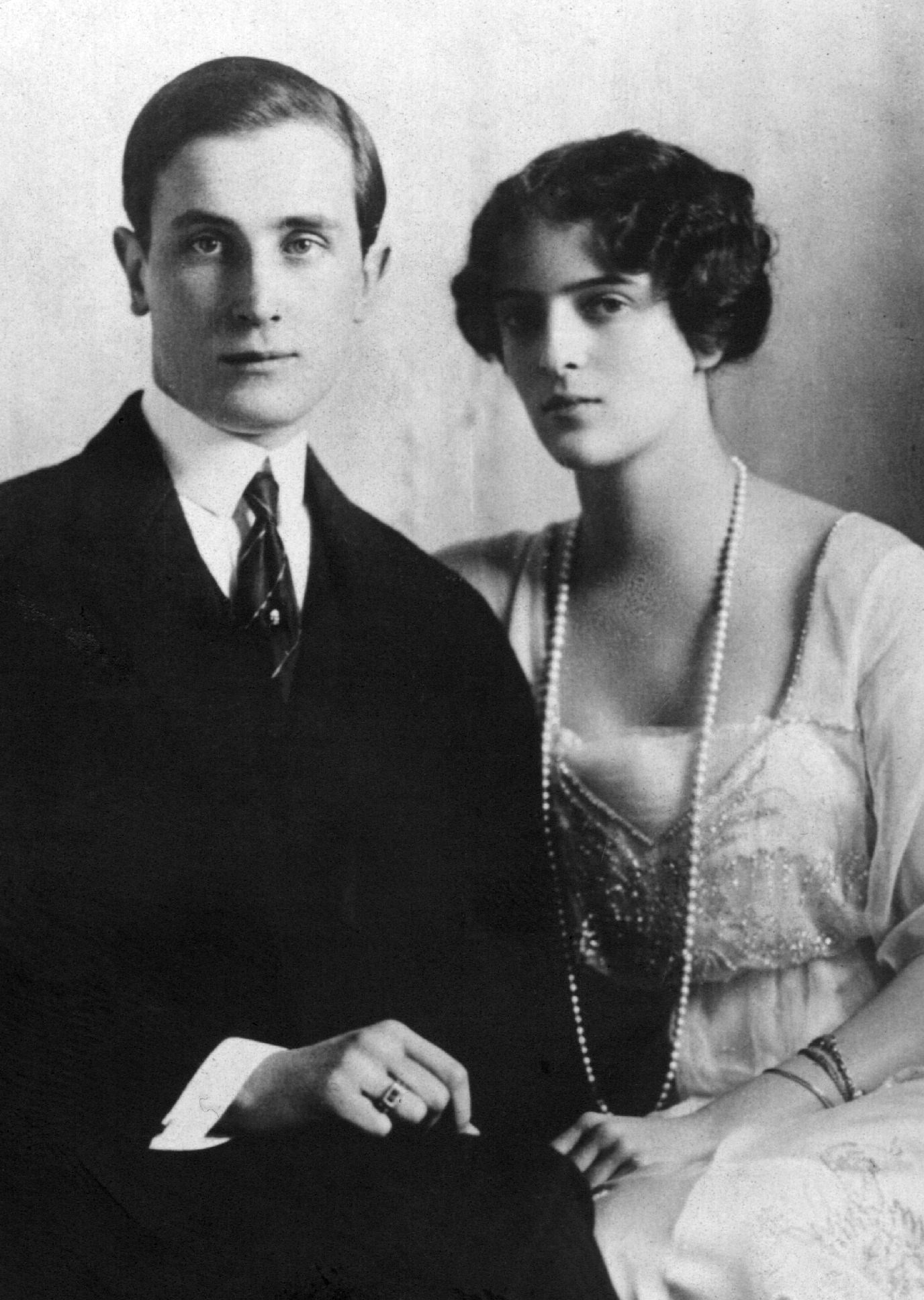
Princess Irina of Russia and her husband, Prince Felix Yusupov

The Yusupovs were on their honeymoon in Europe and the Middle East when World War I broke out. They were briefly detained in Berlin after the outbreak of hostilities. Irina asked her first cousin, Crown Princess Cecilie of Prussia to intervene with her father-in-law, Kaiser Wilhelm II, who refused to permit them to leave, but offered them a choice of three country estates to live in for the duration of the war. Felix's father appealed to the Spanish ambassador and won permission for them to return to Russia via neutral Denmark to Finland and from there to Petrograd. Upon leaving they were belittled by the German people who called them "Russian pigs" and other names.

Felix converted a wing of his Moika Palace into a hospital for wounded soldiers but avoided entering military service himself by taking advantage of a law exempting only-sons from serving in the war. He entered the Cadet Corps and took an officer's training course but had no intention of joining a regiment. Irina's first cousin, Grand Duchess Olga Nikolaevna, to whom she had been close when they were girls, was disdainful of Felix: "Felix is a 'downright civilian,' dressed all in brown, walked to and fro about the room, searching in some bookcases with magazines and virtually doing nothing; an utterly unpleasant impression he makes—a man idling in such times," Olga wrote to her father, Tsar Nicholas II, on 5 March 1915 after paying a visit to the Yusupovs.

Felix and Irina's only daughter, Princess Irina Felixovna Yusupova, nicknamed "Bebé", was born on 21 March 1915. "I shall never forget my happiness when I heard the child's first cry," her father wrote. Irina liked her name and wanted to pass it on to her first child. Her mother Xenia was so worried over the delivery that Tsarina Alexandra Feodorovna said it was almost like Xenia was giving birth instead of Irina.

== Killing of Rasputin ==
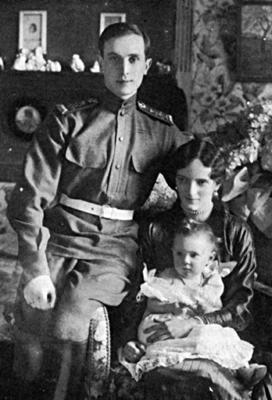
Felix and Irina with their daughter in 1916

Both Felix and Irina were aware of salacious rumors regarding Rasputin and his association with the worsening political situation that brought rioting, protests and violence. Yusupov and his co-conspirators, Vladimir Purishkevich and Dmitri Pavlovich, decided that Rasputin was destroying the country and must be killed. Felix started paying visits to Rasputin in an attempt to gain his trust. It has been speculated that Felix told the healer that he needed assistance to overcome his homosexual impulses and enjoy a satisfactory marriage to Irina or, alternatively, that it was Irina who needed Rasputin's "cure."

On the night of the murder, 16/17 December 1916, Rasputin was invited to Felix's apartment at the Moika Palace. He was told that Irina would be in residence and Rasputin would have an opportunity to meet her. Rasputin had often expressed interest in meeting the beautiful 21-year-old princess. Irina, however, was on a visit to the Crimea. Irina had been aware that Felix had talked about eliminating Rasputin and it was originally intended that she participate in the murder. "You too must take part in it," Felix wrote to her before the murder. "Dm(itri) Pavl(ovich) knows all about it and is helping. It will all take place in the middle of December, when Dm(itri) comes back." In late November 1916, Irina wrote to Felix: "Thanks for your insane letter. I didn't understand the half of it. I see that you're planning to do something wild. Please take care and do not get mixed up in any shady business. The dirtiest thing is that you have decided to do it all without me. I don't see how I can take part in it now, since it's all arranged... In a word, be careful. I see from your letter that you're in a state of wild enthusiasm and ready to climb a wall... I'll be in Petrograd on the 12th or 13th, so don't dare do anything without me, or else I won't come at all."

Felix responded on 27 November 1916: "Your presence by the middle of December is essential. The plan I'm writing you about has been worked out in detail and is three-quarters done, and only the finale is left, and for that your arrival is awaited. It (the murder) is the only way of saving a situation that is almost hopeless.... You will serve as the lure.... Of course, not a word to anyone." A frightened Irina suddenly backed out of the plan on 3 December 1916: "I know that if I come, I shall certainly get sick... You don't know how things are with me. I want to cry all the time. My mood is terrible. I've never had one like it before... I don't know myself what's happening to me. Don't drag me to Petrograd. Come down here instead. Forgive me, my dear one, for writing such things to you. But I can't go on any more, I don't know what's the matter with me. Neurasthenia, I think. Don't be angry with me, please don't be angry. I love you terribly. I can't live without you. May the Lord protect you."

Again, on 9 December 1916, she warned Felix, reporting a foreboding conversation she had had with their 21-month-old daughter: "Something unbelievable's been going on with Baby. A couple of nights ago she didn't sleep well and kept repeating, "War, nanny, war!" The next day she was asked, "War or peace?" And Baby answered, "War!" The next day I said, "Say, 'peace.' " And she looked right at me and answered, "War!" It's very strange."

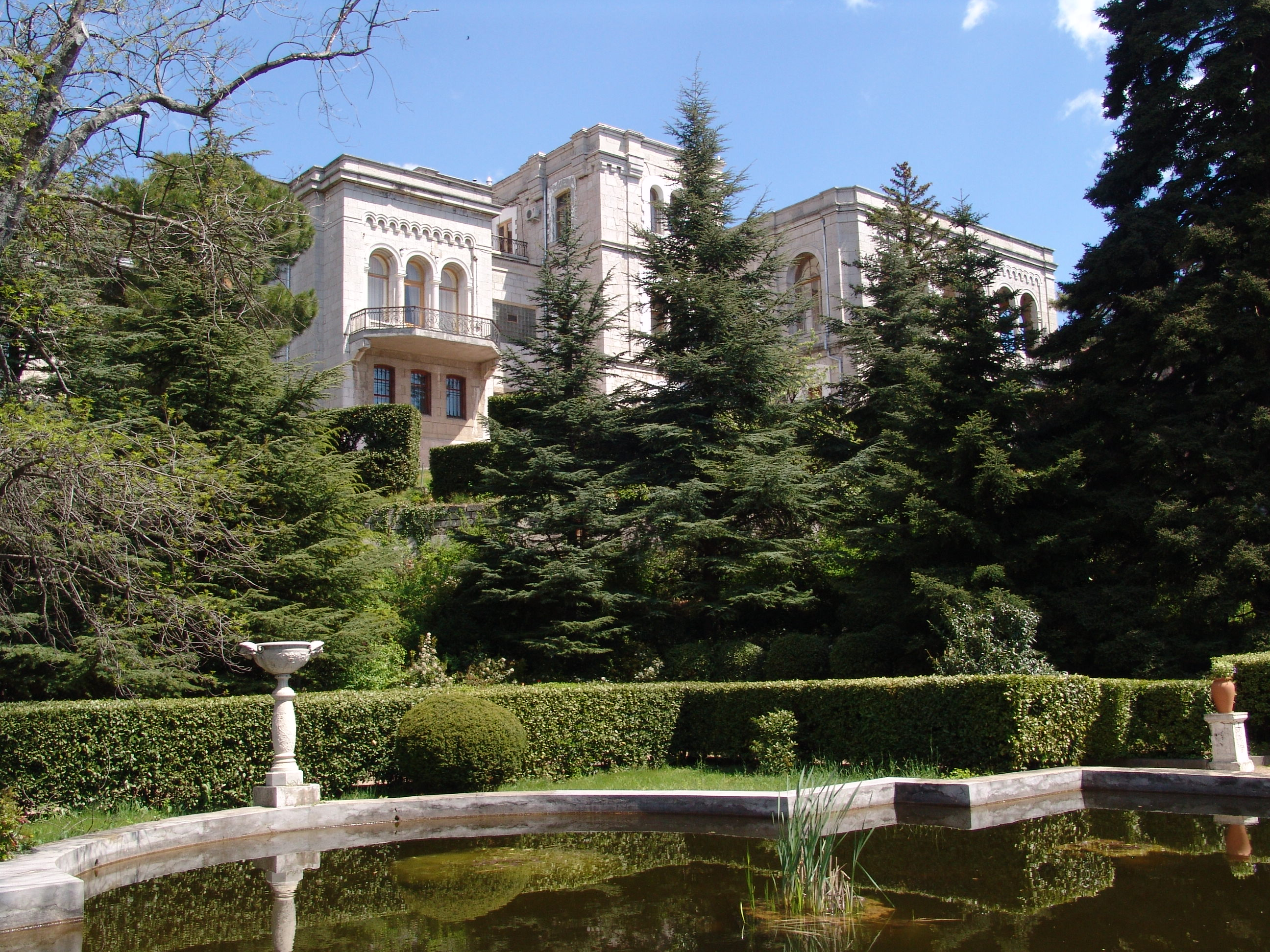
The Yusupov Palace near Koreiz

Irina's pleas were in vain. Her husband and his co-conspirators went forward with the plan without her. After the killing, Nicolas exiled both Yusupov and Dmitri Pavlovich. Felix was exiled to Rakitnoye, a remote country estate in the Rakityansky District that had been owned by the family since 1729. Dmitri was exiled to the Persian front with the army. Sixteen members of the family signed a letter asking the Tsar to reconsider his decision due to Dmitri's weak health, but Nicholas II refused to consider the petition. "Nobody has the right to kill on his own private judgment," wrote Nicholas II. "I know that there are many others besides Dmitri Pavlovich whose consciences give them no rest, because they are compromised. I am astonished that you should have applied to me." Irina's father, "Sandro", visited the couple at Rakitnoye in February 1917 and found their mood "buoyant, but militant."

Felix still hoped that Nicholas and the Russian government would respond to Rasputin's death by taking steps to address the increasing political unrest. Felix refused to permit Irina to leave Rakitnoye to join her mother in Petrograd because he felt it was too dangerous. The Tsar abdicated on 2 March, OS, and he and his family were arrested by the Bolsheviks. They were eventually murdered at Yekaterinburg on 17 July 1918. His decision to exile Felix and Dmitri meant that they were among the few members of the Romanov family to escape execution during the Bolshevik Revolution that followed.

== Exile ==
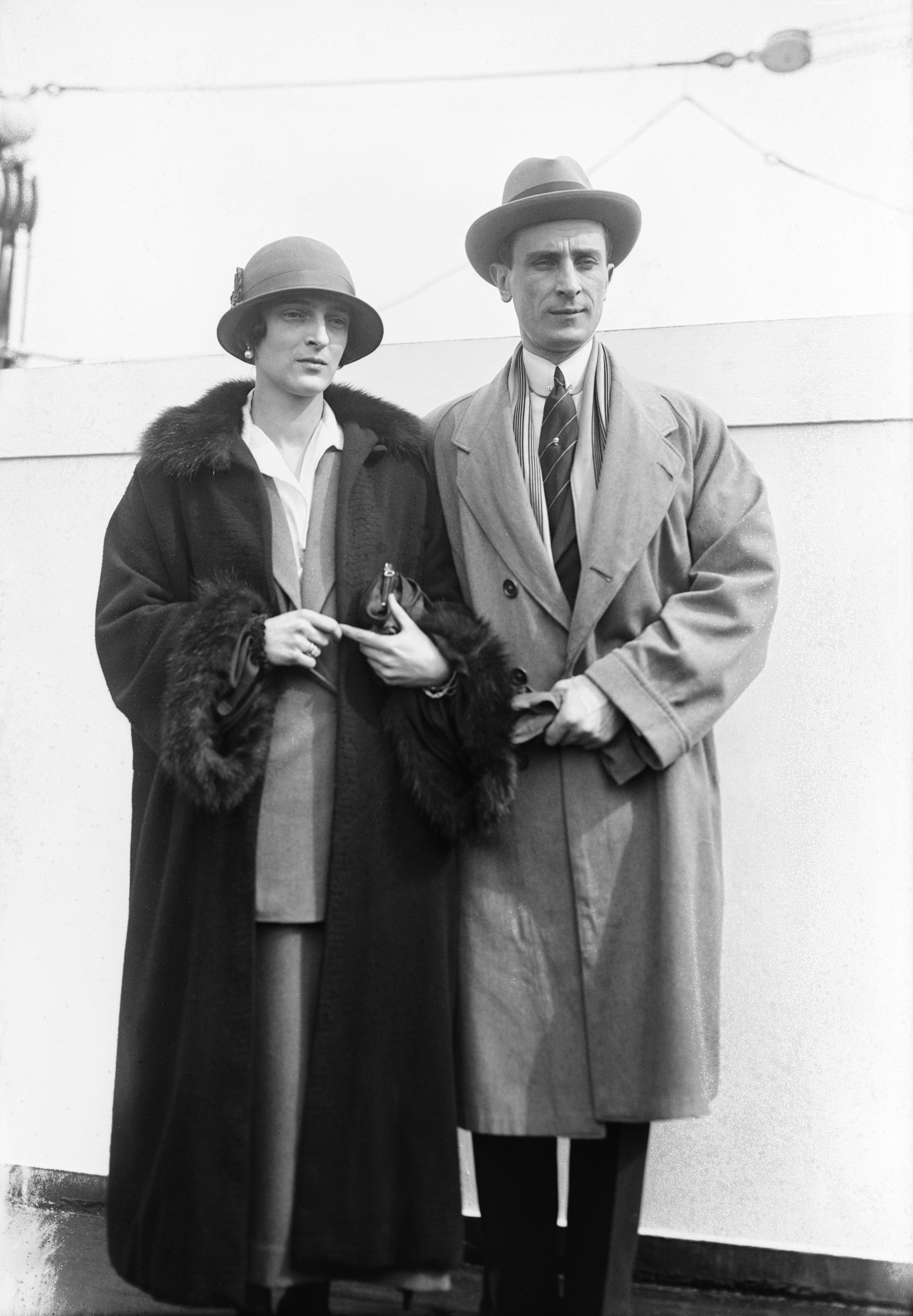
Irina and Felix in exile

Following the abdication of the Tsar, the Yusupovs returned to the Moika Palace before going to Crimea. They later returned to the Palace to retrieve jewellery and two paintings by Rembrandt, the sale proceeds of which helped sustain the family in exile. In Crimea, the family boarded a British warship, HMS Marlborough, which took them from Yalta to Malta. Felix enjoyed boasting about killing Rasputin while he was on the ship. One of the British officers noted that Irina "appeared shy and retiring at first, but it was only necessary to take a little notice of her pretty, small daughter to break through her reserve and discover that she was also very charming and spoke fluent English". From there, they traveled to Italy and by train to Paris. In Italy, lacking a visa, Felix bribed the officials with diamonds. In Paris, they stayed a few days in Hôtel de Vendôme before they went on to London.

In 1920, they returned to Paris and bought a house on the Rue Gutenberg in Boulogne-sur-Seine, where they lived most of their lives. Early in the year a disagreement between Dmitri Pavlovich and Felix brought to light Felix's feelings towards his role in the murder of Rasputin. "You talked about it, you almost boast about it, that you did it with your own hand" said a distraught Dmitri in a letter trying to end his friendship with Felix. In 1924, they founded a short-lived couture house called Irfé, which took its name from the first two letters of the names Irina and Felix. Irina modeled some of the dresses. Irfé was later relaunched by Olga Sorokina in 2008. The Yusupovs became renowned in the Russian émigré community for their financial generosity. This philanthropy and their continued high living and poor financial management extinguished what remained of the family fortune. Their daughter was largely raised (and spoiled) by her paternal grandparents until she was nine. Her unstable upbringing caused her to become "capricious," according to Felix. Felix and Irina, raised mainly by nannies themselves, were ill-suited to take on the day-to-day burdens of child-rearing. Irina's daughter adored her father but had a more distant relationship with her mother.

Later the family lived from the proceeds of a lawsuit they won against MGM for making a 1932 movie called Rasputin and the Empress. The lecherous Rasputin seduces the Tsar's only niece, called "Princess Natasha", in the film. Irina was the Czar's only niece by blood, but not his only niece, as he had three nieces from his wife's siblings. In 1934, the Yusupovs won a large judgment against the movie studio. Felix also sued CBS in a New York court in 1965 for televising a play based upon the Rasputin killing. The claim was that some events were fictionalized, and under a New York statute, Felix's commercial rights in his story had been misappropriated. The last reported judicial opinion in the case was a ruling by New York's second highest court that the case could not be resolved upon briefs and affidavits but must go to trial. (Note: Youssoupoff v. Columbia Broadcasting System, Inc., 19 A.D.2d 865 (1963).) According to an obituary of CBS's lawyer, CBS eventually won the case.

Felix also wrote his memoirs and continued to be both celebrated and infamous as the man who murdered Rasputin. For the rest of his life, he was haunted by the killing and suffered from nightmares. However, he also had a reputation as a faith healer.

Irina and Felix, close to one another as they were distant from their daughter, enjoyed a happy and successful marriage for more than 50 years. When Felix died in 1967, Irina was stricken by grief and died three years later.

== Descendants ==
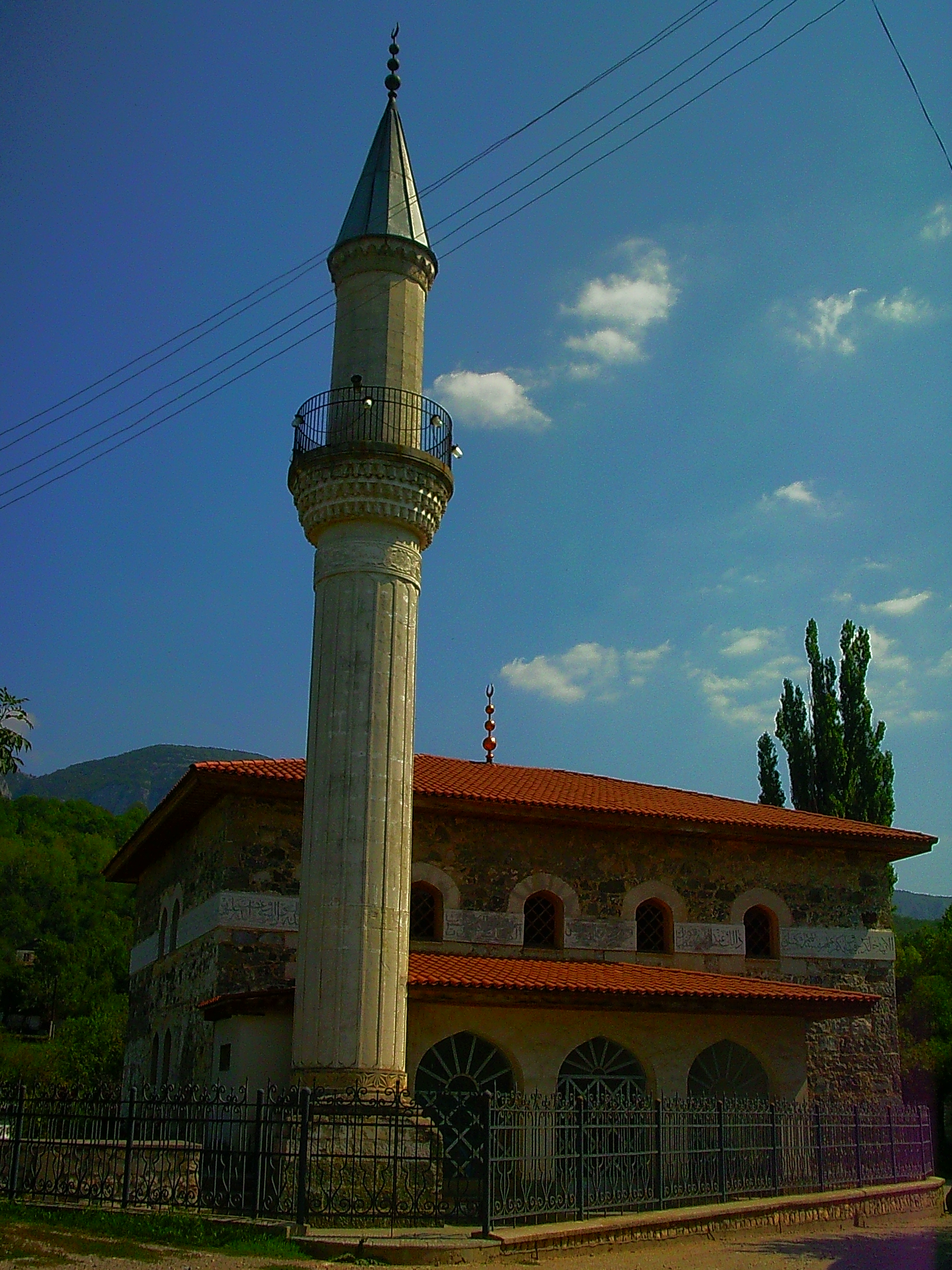
Felix seems to have designed the Yusupov's Mosque

Descendants of Felix and Irina are:

- Princess Irina Felixovna Yusupova, (21 March 1915, Saint Petersburg, Russia – 30 August 1983, Cormeilles-en-Parisis, France), married Count Nikolai Dmitrievich Sheremetev (28 October 1904, Moscow, Russia – 5 February 1979, Paris, France), son of Count Dmitry Sergeevich Sheremetev and wife Countess Irina Ilarionovna Vorontzova-Dachkova and a descendant of Boris Petrovich Sheremetev; had issue:
  - Countess Xenia Nikolaevna Sheremeteva (born 1 March 1942, Rome, Italy), married on 20 June 1965 in Athens, Greece, to Ilias Sfiris (born 20 August 1932, Athens, Greece); had issue:
    - Tatiana Sfiris (born 28 August 1968, Athens, Greece), married in May 1996 in Athens to Alexis Giannakoupoulos (born 1963), divorced, no issue; married Anthony Vamvakidis and has issue:
      - Marilia Vamvakidis (born 7 July 2004)
      - Yasmine Xenia Vamvakidis (born 17 May 2006)

== Ancestry ==
Ancestors of Princess Irina Alexandrovna of Russia

8. Nicholas I of Russia
4. Grand Duke Michael Nikolaevich of Russia
9. Princess Charlotte of Prussia
2. Grand Duke Alexander Mikhailovich of Russia
10. Leopold, Grand Duke of Baden
5. Princess Cecilie of Baden
11. Princess Sophie of Sweden
1. Princess Irina Alexandrovna of Russia
12. Alexander II of Russia
6. Alexander III of Russia
13. Princess Marie of Hesse and by Rhine
3. Grand Duchess Xenia Alexandrovna of Russia
14. Christian IX of Denmark
7. Princess Dagmar of Denmark
15. Princess Louise of Hesse-Kassel

== Footnotes ==
Inline citations
