= Olga Sorokina =

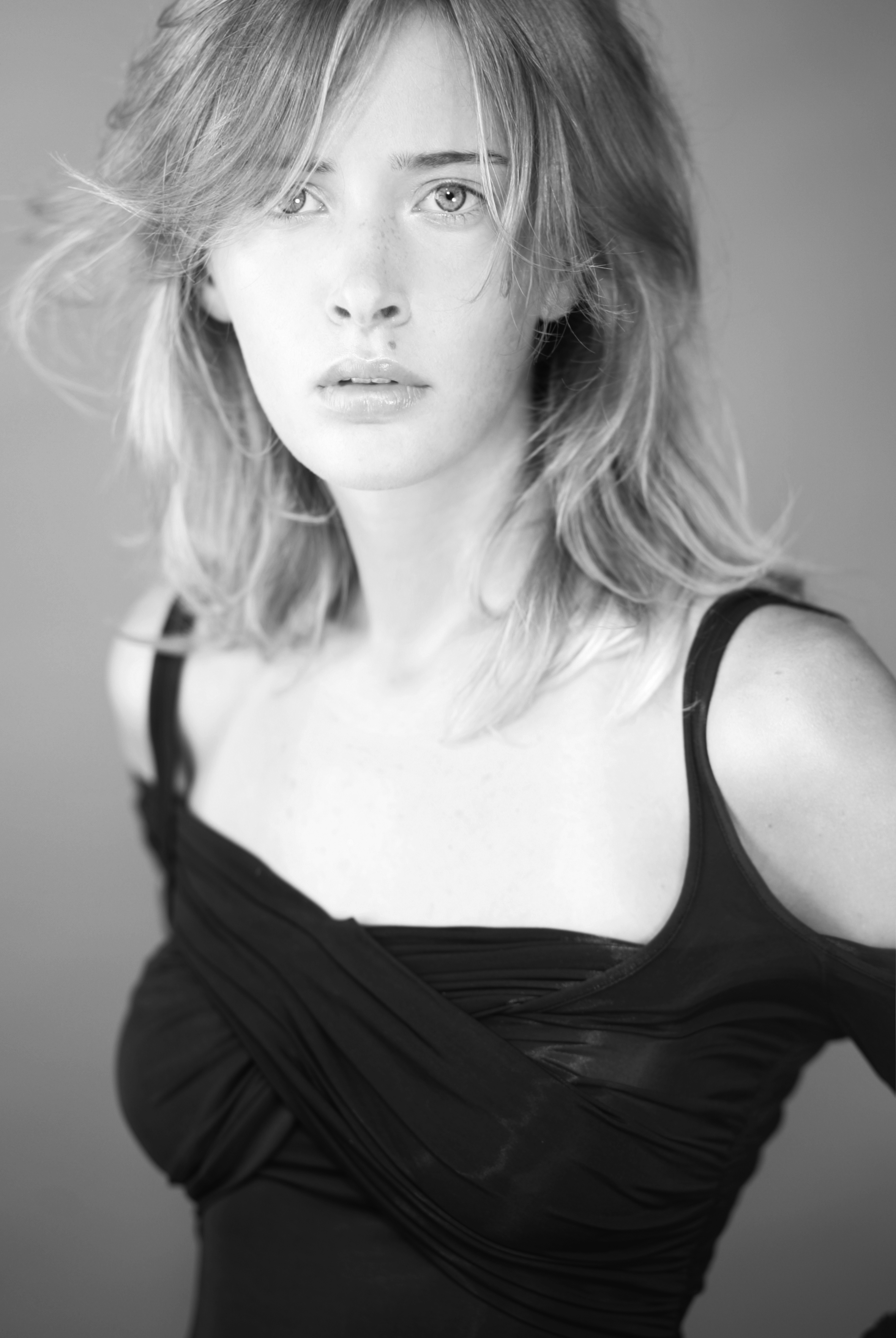
- Olga Sorokina
- Born: 21 January 1985 (age 41); Vitebsk, Belarus
- Occupations: Creative director Model
- Children: Vadim and Victor
- Modeling information
- Height: 1.75 m (5 ft 9 in)
- Hair color: Brown-Blond
- Eye color: Blue
- Website: www.olgasorokina.com

Olga Borisovna Sorokina (born January 21, 1985, Vitebsk) is a Belarusian model, owner and Creative Director of French fashion house IRFĒ.

== Career ==
- At 17 years old, she was enrolled in a NEXT model agency (Moscow).
- In 2005, Fashion TV named her model of the year, thereby winning the golden ticket to the world of fashion.
- She was working as a model in Moscow, New York, before the birth of her son Vadim in 2007.
- After reading the book of the fashion historian Alexander Vassilyev "Beauty in Exile" about Russian fashion houses that existed many years ago, Olga discovered the history of IRFĒ Fashion House. After an inspiring meeting with Xenia Sheremeteva-Sphiris, the granddaughter of the legendary founders of the IRFĒ fashion house, Felix Yusupov and Irina Yusupova at their family house in Paris, Olga decided to try herself "on the other side of the runway" as the creative director.
- In July 2008, during Paris Couture Week, after an 80-year break period, a presentation was held at the Palais Tokyo about the revival of the legendary French fashion house IRFĒ, which was founded in 1924 in Paris by Prince Felix Yussoupov and the niece of Emperor Nicholas II, Princess Irina Romanova.
- In 2009, the design studio and the Maison IRFĒ showroom were established by Olga in Paris on rue du Faubourg Saint-Honoré, 4. IRFĒ's collections are sold in more than 50 stores in 20 countries around the world.
- In March 2010, the first Maison IRFĒ corner opened in Moscow (TSUM), then in Barvikha (Barvikha Luxury Village), DLT (St. Petersburg) and a store on the island of Capri (Italy).
- In October 2013, due to the 400th anniversary of the Romanov dynasty, Olga presented the first runway show of the Maison IRFĒ collection during Paris Fashion week.
- In December 2020, the Maison had its holiday dinner at Majorelle New York, where new dresses were introduced.

== Philanthropy ==
in charity events, and supporting projects related to the arts and culture in different countries of the world: Art of Elysium and the Elton John AIDS Foundation in Los Angeles, AmFAR in New York and Cannes, SIDACTION charity dinner in Paris, a retrospective exhibition of the British artist Marc Quinn at the Moscow Multimedia Art Museum and the Vadim Zakharov's project "Dead Languages Dance" in the framework of the 5th Moscow Biennale of Contemporary Art in Moscow.
