= Royal Salute (anthem) =

National and royal anthem of Iran (1873–1909)

Salām-e Shāh
English: Royal Salute
- سلام شاه
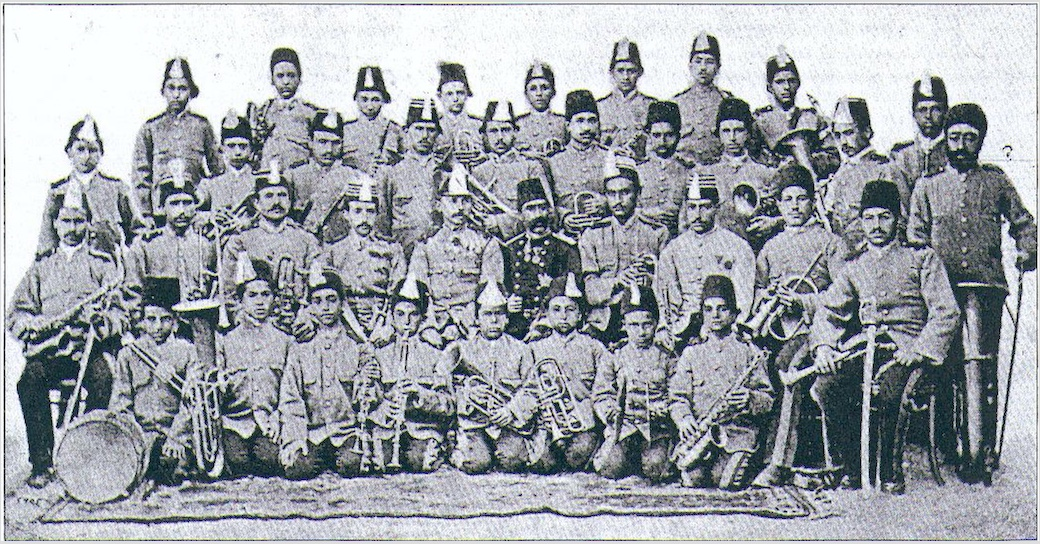
- Former national and royal anthem of Iran
- Music: Alfred Jean Baptiste Lemaire, 1873
- Adopted: 1873
- Relinquished: 1909
- Succeeded by: "Salute of the Sublime State of Persia"

Audio sample
- Modernized rendition: file; help

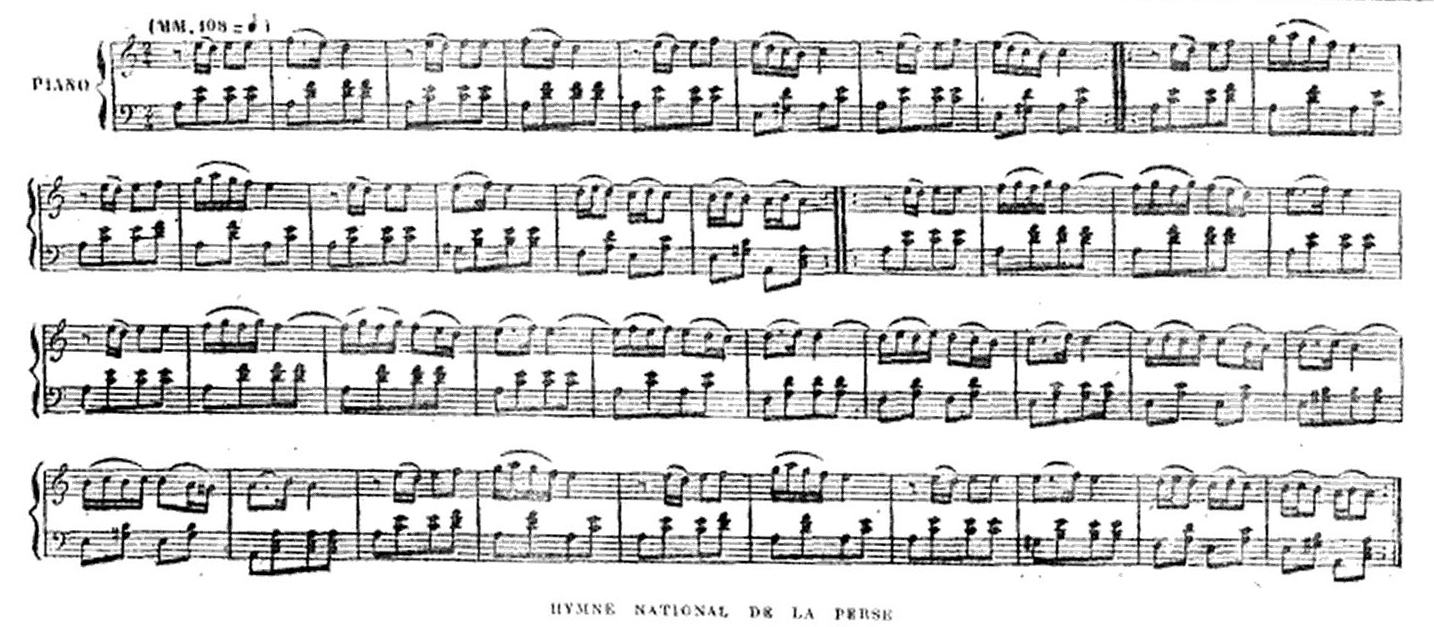
Piano reduction.

The "Royal Salute", (Note: Persian: سلام شاه, romanised: Salām-e Shāh, IPA: [sæˈlɒːme ʃɒː(ɦ)]) also known as the "Health of the Shah", (Note: Persian: سلامتی شاه, romanised: Salāmati-ye Shāh, IPA: [sælɒːmæˈt̪ʰiːje ʃɒː(ɦ)]) was the first royal and national anthem of Qajar Iran between 1873 and 1909. The French musician Alfred Jean Baptiste Lemaire composed this anthem in 1873 on the orders of Naser al-Din Shah. It had no lyrics. Salām-e Shāh was played in official ceremonies during the reigns of Naser al-Din Shah, Mozaffar ad-Din Shah and Mohammad Ali Shah Qajar. It was also played as the Persian (Iranian) national anthem during Naser al-Din Shah’s and Mozaffar ad-Din Shah's European tours.

In 1909, after the fall of Mohammad Ali Shah Qajar, the anthem was abolished, and after the coronation of his son and successor Ahmad Shah in 1914, Salute of the Sublime State of Persia was adopted as the Iranian national anthem.

== Rearrangement ==
This anthem was rearranged, recomposed and orchestrated by the Iranian composer Siavash Beizai. Only the main parts of this song are derived from the original version. There are also some harmonic and formal corrections in this piece. The introduction, the middle part, and closing part were composed by Siavash Beizai too. Due to the great popularity of this anthem, it has been increasingly misused by the official state broadcaster, IRIB, and the government without any permission from Siavash Beizai.

Bijan Taraghi was asked by Peyman Soltani, the leader of Melal Orchestra of Iran, to write lyrics for the old national anthem. This new anthem version was performed in October 2005 by the Melal Orchestra of Iran. The singer in this version was Salar Aghili.

1910

1906
