= Rakitnoye, Amur Oblast =

Rakitnoye Ракитное
- Selo
- Location within Amur Oblast Location within Russia
- Coordinates: 50°28′N 128°06′E
- Country: Russia
- Region: Amur Oblast
- District: Ivanovsky District
- Time zone: UTC+9:00

Rakitnoye (Russian: Ракитное) is a rural locality (a selo) in Novoalexeyevsky Selsoviet of Ivanovsky District, Amur Oblast, Russia. The population was 66 as of 2018. There are 6 streets.

== Geography ==
Rakitnoye is located 19 km northeast of Ivanovka (the district's administrative centre) by road. Lugovoye is the nearest rural locality.
