= Imperial Anthem of Iran =

Royal and national anthem of Iran (1933–1979)

"Sorud-e Shâhanshâhi-ye Irân"
English: Imperial Anthem of Iran
- سرود شاهنشاهی ایران
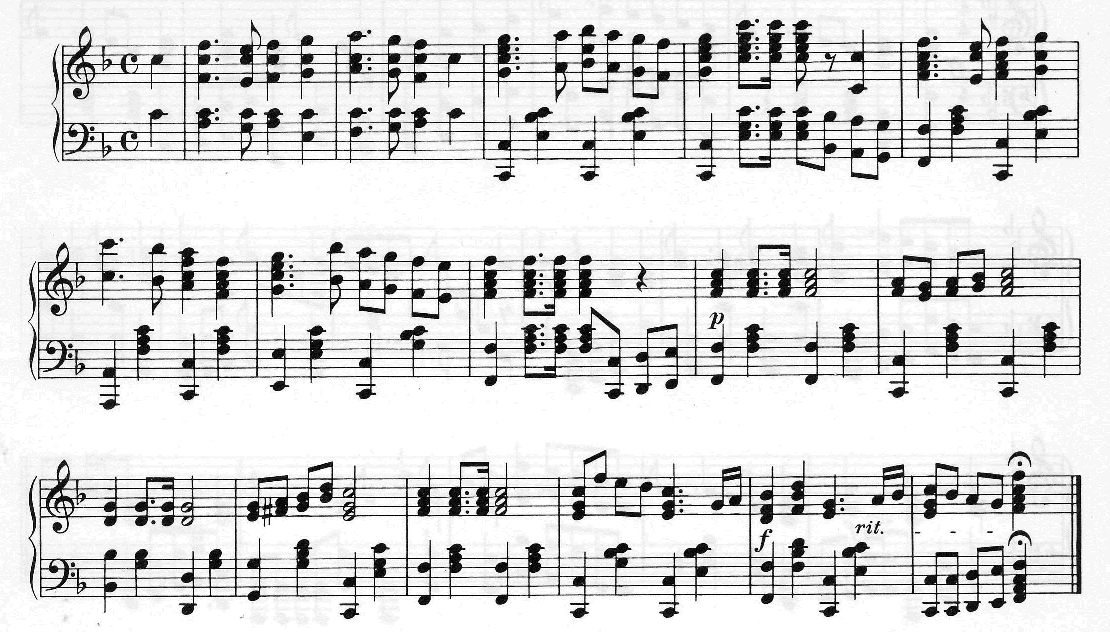
- Former royal and flag anthem of Iran
- Lyrics: Mohammad-Hashem Afsar (Sheikh al-Ra'is), 1933
- Music: Davud Najmi Moqaddam, 1933
- Adopted: 1933; 93 years ago
- Relinquished: 11 February 1979; 47 years ago
- Preceded by: Salute of the Sublime State of Persia
- Succeeded by: "Ey Iran" (de facto, as national anthem) "Payandeh Bada Iran" (de jure, as national anthem)

Audio sample
- "Sorud-e Shâhanshâhi" (vocal, first stanza): file; help

Instrumental version (first stanza)
performed by the United States Navy Band

"Sorude Shāhanshāhiye Irān"
with santoor (also first stanza)

"Sorud-e Shâhanshâhi-ye Irân"
with trombone (also first stanza)

The Imperial Anthem of Iran, (Note: Persian: سرود شاهنشاهی ایران, romanized: Sorud-e Shâhanshâhi-ye Irân, pronounced [soˈɹuːde ʃɒːˌhæn.ʃɒːˈhiːje ʔiːˈɹɒːn]) also known by its incipit "Long Live our King of Kings", (Note: Persian: شاهنشه ما زنده بادا, romanized: Shâhanshâh-e mâ zende bâdâ, pronounced [ˌʃɒːhænˈʃɒːhe mɒː zenˈde bɒːˈdɒː]) was the royal anthem (stanza 1) of Iran from 1933 until the Iranian Revolution of 1979, when the monarchy was abolished.

Its tune, when set to a different respective set of lyrics, also simultaneously served as both the country's national (stanza 3) and flag anthem (stanza 2). This anthem was composed by the order of Reza Shah, with lyrics written by Mohammad-Hashem Afsar (stanza 1) and Abdolrahman Parsa Tuyserkani (stanza 2) and prepared by the Literary Association of Iran ahead of Reza Shah's visit to Turkey.

Lion and Sun Flag Anthem
Choral rendition of the Flag Anthem (Second stanza)

== Lyrics ==
Persian script

شاهنشه ما زنده بادا
پايد کشور به فرش جاودان
کز پهلوی شد ملک ایران
صد ره بهتر ز عهد باستان
از دشمنان بودی پریشان
در سايه‌اش آسوده ایران
ايرانیان پيوسته شادان
همواره يزدان بود او را نگهبان

ای پرچم خورشید ایران
پرتو افکن به روی این جهان
یاد آور از آن روزگاری
کآسود از برق تیغت بر کران
در سایه‌ات جان می‌فشانیم
از دشمنان جان می‌ستانیم
ما وارث ملک کیانیم
همیشه خواهیم وطن را از دل و جان

بودیم و هستیم پیرو حق
جز حق هرگز نخواهیم از جهان
با شه‌پرستی مملکت را
داریم از دست دشمن در امان
ما پیرو کردار نیکیم
روشندل از پندار نیکیم
رخشنده از گفتار نیکیم
شد زین فضائل بلندآوازه ایران

Romanization of Farsi

Shâhanshâh-e mâ zende bâdâ
Pâyad keshvar be farash jâvedân
Kaz Pahlavi shod molk-e Irân
Sad rah behtar ze ahd-e bâsetân
Az doshmanân budi parishân
Dar sâye-ash âsude Irân
Irâniyân peyvaste shâdân
Hamvâre Yazdân bovad u râ negahbân.

Ey parcham-e khorshid-e Irân
Partov afkan be ru-ye in jahân
Yâd âvar az ân ruzegâri
Kâsud az barq-e tighat bar karân
Dar sâye-at jân mi-feshânim
Az doshmanân jân mi-setânim
Mâ vâres-e molk-e kiyânim
Hamishe khâhim vatan râ az del va jân.

Budim va hastim peyrov-e haq
Joz haq hargez nakhâhim az jahân
Bâ shâh-parasti mamlekat râ
Dârim az dast-e doshman dar amân
Mâ peyrov-e kerdâr-e nikim
Rovshandel az pendâr-e nikim
Rakhshande az goftâr-e nikim
Shod zin fazâyel boland-âvâze Irân.

IPA transcription

[ʃɒːhænˈʃɒːhe mɒː zenˈde bɒːˈdɒː |]
[pʰɒːˈjæd kʰeʃˈvæɹ be fæˈɹæʃ d͡ʒɒːveˈdɒːn |]
[kʰæz pʰæɦlæˈviː ʃod ˈmolkʰe ʔiːˈɹɒːn |]
[sæd ɹæɦ beɦˈtʰæɹ ze ˈʔæɦde bɒːseˈtʰɒːn ǁ]
[ʔæz doʃmæˈnɒːn | buːˈdiː pʰæɹiːˈʃɒːn |]
[dæɹ sɒːˈje.ʔæʃ ʔɒːsuːˈde ʔiːˈɹɒːn |]
[ʔiːˌɹɒːniːˈjɒːn | pʰejvæsˈtʰe ʃɒːˈdɒːn |]
[hæɱvɒːˈɹe jæzˈdɒːn | boˈvæd ʔuː ɹɒː negæɦˈbɒːn ǁ]

[ʔej pʰæɹˈt͡ʃʰæme xoɹˈʃide ʔiːˈɹɒːn |]
[pʰæɹˈtʰow ʔæfˈkʰæn be ˈɹuːje ʔiːn d͡ʒæˈhɒːn |]
[jɒːd ʔɒːˈvæɹ ʔæz ʔɒːn ɹuːzegɒːˈɹiː |]
[kʰɒːˈsuːd ʔæz ˈbæɹɢe tʰiːˈɢæt bæɹ kʰæˈɹɒːn ǁ]
[dæɹ sɒːˈje.ʔæt d͡ʒɒːn ˈmiːfeˌʃɒːniːm |]
[ʔæz doʃmæˈnɒːn | d͡ʒɒːn ˈmiːseˌtʰɒːniːm |]
[mɒː vɒːˈɹese | ˈmolkʰe kʰiːˈjɒːniːm |]
[hæmiːˈʃe xɒːˈhiːm | væˈtʰæn ɹɒː ʔæz del væ d͡ʒɒːn ǁ]

[ˈbuːdiːm væ ˈhæstʰiːm pʰejˈɹove hæɢ |]
[d͡ʒoz hæɢ hæɹˈgez næxɒːˈhiːm ʔæz d͡ʒæˈhɒːn |]
[bɒː ˌʃɒːɦ.pʰæɹæsˈtʰiː mæmleˈkʰæt ɹɒː |]
[ˈdɒːɹiːm ʔæz ˈdæstʰe doʃˈmæn dæɹ ʔæˈmɒːn ǁ]
[mɒː pʰejˈɹove kʰeɹˈdɒːɹe niːˈkʰiːm |]
[ɹowʃænˈdel | ʔæz pʰenˈdɒːɹe niːˈkʰiːm |]
[ɹæxʃænˈde | ʔæz gofˈtʰɒːɹe niːˈkʰiːm |]
[ʃod ziːn fæzɒːˈjel | boˌlænd.ʔɒːvɒːˈze ʔiːˈɹɒːn ǁ]

English translation

Long live our King of Kings,
And may His glory make immortal our land
For Pahlavi improved Iran,
A hundredfold from where it once used to stand.
Though once beset by the foemen's rage,
Now it has peace in His keeping sure.
We of Iran, rejoice in every age,
O may God protect Him both now and evermore.

O Sun that shines on Iran's banner,
Shed upon each nation rays strong and fair.
Those days keep in our recollection
When thy flashing sword brought peace everywhere.
We give our lives in thy shade benign,
And take the lives of each enemy.
We are the heirs of Kayanid's line;
O beloved land, ever wholly thine are we.

Of Right we've been and still are champions.
What is right is all we ever demand.
Through worship of King, we ever
from the enemy will guard this our land.
"Good Deeds" the first virtue of our call,
"Good Thoughts" the light our hearts and minds to guide,
And through "Good Speech" shining, one and all,
'Tis the fame of Iran that shall echo far and wide.
