= Nasrollah Minbashian =

Iranian musician (1885–1938)

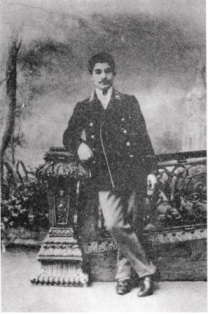
Nasrollah Minbashian at the Conservatory in Saint Petersburg

Nasrollah Minbashian (Persian: نصرالله مین‌باشیان) was born in 1885, and received musical education from his father Gholam Reza Minbashian in Dar al-Fonun, as well as from the French music teacher Alfred Jean Baptiste Lemaire. In 1898, he was 13 years old when his father took him to Saint Petersburg and enrolled him in the conservatory, while Gholam Reza himself followed lessons by Rimsky-Korsakov. When he left Russia in 1891, Gholam Reza arranged for his son to stay with his teacher at the conservatory, so that Nasrollah could continue his education privately as well. Nasrollah Minbashian would stay there for seven years. In 1905, he was 20 years old and returned to Iran to teach the cello. He stayed a few years in Shiraz, but then returned to Russia in 1912 where he became the piano teacher of Princess Irina Alexandrovna Romanova.

Back in Iran, he entered the Persian Cossack Brigade with the rank of captain. He remained there until reaching the rank of brigadier general. In 1915, he began teaching violin and cello at Dar ul-Funun.

1921, he became deputy director of military music, which he combined with directing the School of Music, by succeeding his father. He held these two directorships until 1935, while teaching several instruments which he mastered: the piano, the violin and the cello. He also composed several national anthems using the works of the poets Ferdowsi and Saadi. He died on 29 August 1938 at the age of 53.

Nasrollah's grandson, Sepehr Haddad, is a musician. He has also written the novel A Hundred Sweet Promises based on a true story of Nasrollah Minbashian's life and his travel to Russia.
