= IRFĒ =

French fashion house

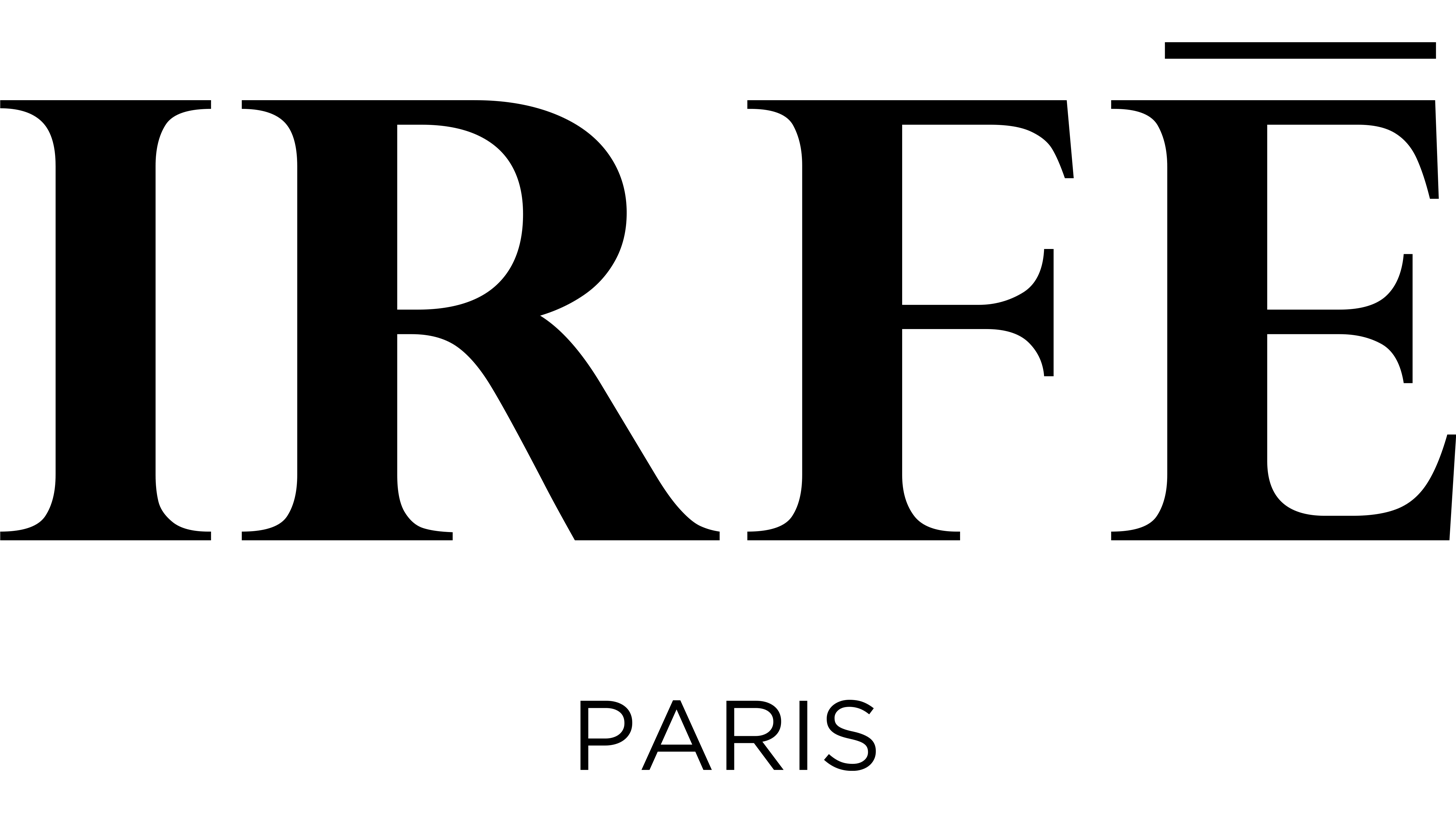
- Industry: Fashion
- Founded: 1924; 102 years ago
- Founder: Felix Yussoupov, Irina Romanova
- Headquarters: 4 rue du Faubourg Saint-Honoré, Paris, France
- Key people: Olga Sorokina
- Products: Haute couture, accessories
- Website: www.irfe.com

IRFĒ is a French fashion house. Its first iteration was founded by Felix Yussoupov and Irina Romanova in 1924 and ran until 1931. The house was reestablished by Olga Sorokina in 2013.

== History ==
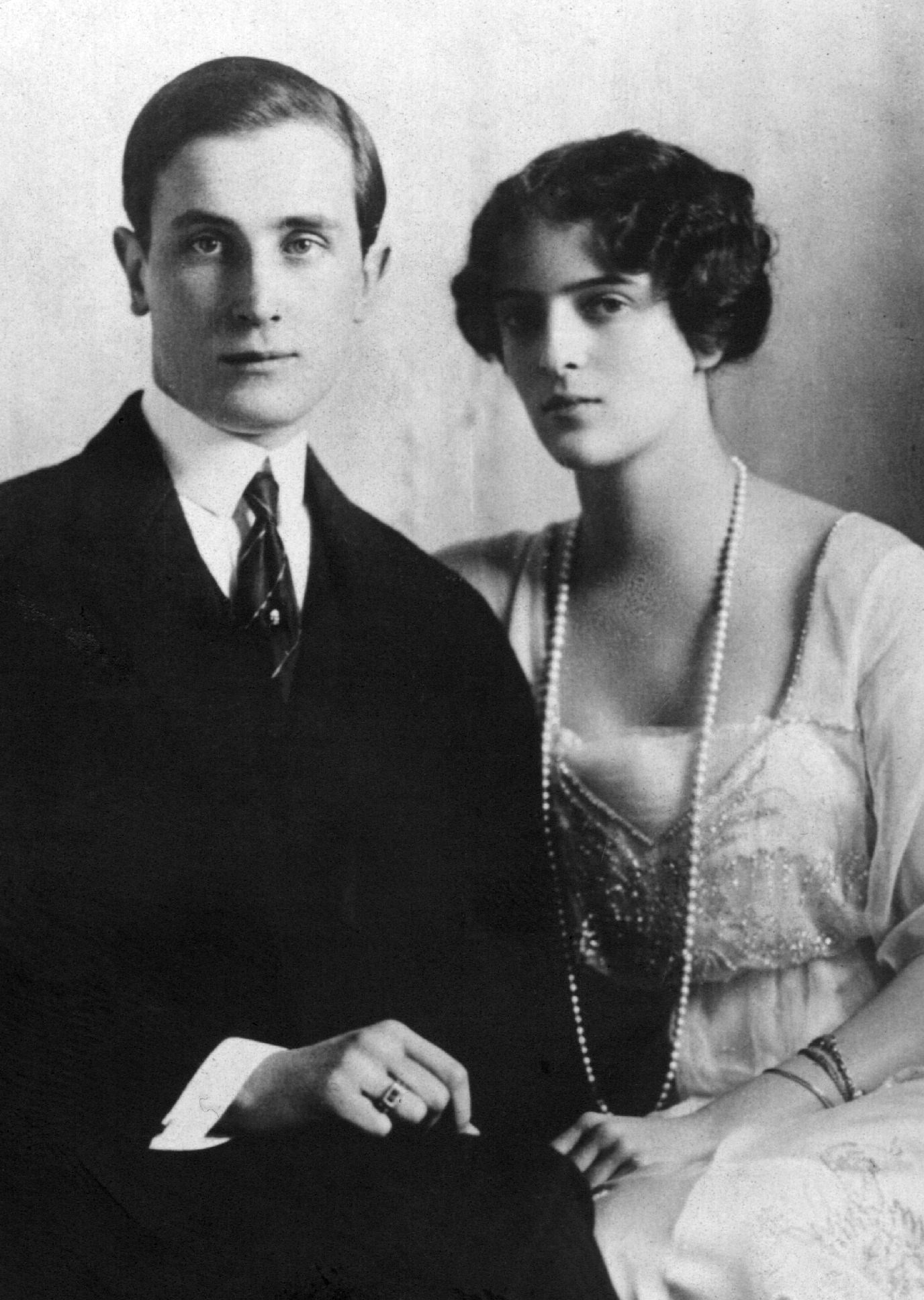
Husband and wife Felix Yussoupov and Irina Romanova, co-founders

IRFĒ was founded in Paris in 1924 by Irina Romanova and Felix Yusupov, Count Sumarokov-Elston. Its name came from the first initials of its founders, IRFĒ occupied the entire ground floor, and later the first floor, of a house located at 10 rue Duphot. Almost the entire staff consisted of a couple of friends of the Yussoupov and other Russian immigrants. As models, there were not only girls especially hired for this purpose, but also Irina Alexandrovna with some of her friends.

The presentation of the first collection was held at the Hôtel Ritz on Place Vendôme and impressed the high society of Paris. Over the first weeks after the opening, Maison IRFĒ rapidly gained famed, mainly due to the public interest of Felix Yussoupov and rumors concerning his person. In his memoirs, he mentions that the client "came out of curiosity and for the excitement". Another requested a tea from a samovar and one American lady wanted to see "the Prince, which is rumored to have phosphorescent eyes, like a predator!"

This first successful business experience encouraged Felix Yussoupov to open a porcelain shop, together with Baron Edmond de Zyuilanom, in 1925 on rue Richepanse, nearby Maison IRFĒ. Later, the prince took part in decorating the Parisian restaurant Maisonette on rue du Mont-Thabor, in a "Russian style", and opened the restaurant Lido; the maker of the interiors was painter Shukhaiev.

In 1925, Maison IRFĒ opened a first branch in Le Touquet, where Irina Alexandrovna's cousin – Prince Gabriel Constantinovich and his wife, Antonina Rafailovna Nesterovskaya, former ballerina of the Imperial Ballet – took care of the business.

Then, it subsequently opened two more branches in London on Berkeley Street, under the leadership of a certain Mrs Ensil and in Berlin, in a house on Parizerplatts Radziwill. In 1926, IRFĒ launched its own perfume line. It was limited and conceived in four flavors: Blonde for blondes, Brunette for brunettes, Titiane for red-haired women and Grey Silver for women of an elegant age.

In 1931, Maison IRFĒ and all its branches closed down for economic reasons. The perfume venture remained for a few years longer in the atelier.

== Present day ==
After a 90-year break, IRFĒ fashion house was restored by its new owner Olga Sorokina. The latter had read the book Beauty in Exile about artists who had fled the Russian Revolution, and then arranged a meeting with the granddaughter of the founders to talk about reviving the brand.

Maison IRFĒ's design studio and headquarters are currently located in Paris on rue du Faubourg Saint-Honoré. The House offers high-end ready-to-wear clothing garments and accessories, made in French and Italian ateliers. Maison IRFĒ made its debut fashion show during Paris Fashion Week in September 2013, also as this year celebrates the 400th anniversary of the Romanov dynasty.
