= Alfred Jean Baptiste Lemaire =

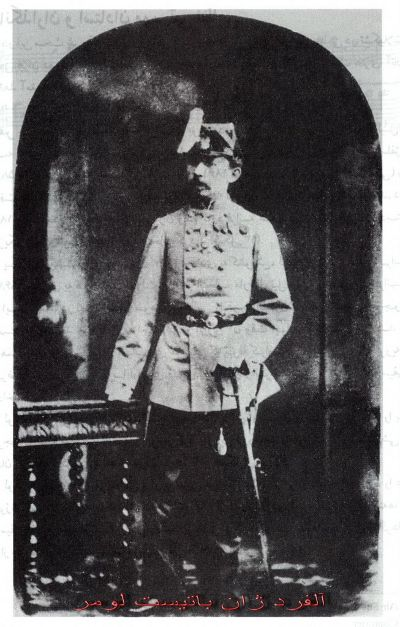
Alfred-Jean-Baptiste-Lemaire

Alfred Jean-Baptiste Lemaire (15 January 1842 – 24 February 1907) was a French military musician and composer. He is known for teaching at the music department of Dar ul-Funun during the reign of Naser al-Din Shah Qajar, and for composing the first Iranian national anthem.

== Life ==
Lemaire was born in Aire-sur-la-Lys and entered the Paris Conservatory in 1855, graduating in flute and composition in 1863. By 1867 he had become Deputy Music Master for the Infantry of the Imperial Guard. When Naser al-Din Shah visited Paris, he admired the French military bands that had welcomed him. At the time Iranian military music had used only traditional drums (naqareh) and trumpets (karnay). On his return to Iran in 1867 the shah asked his ambassador to France, Hassan-Ali Garrussi, to hire a French musician to reorganize his military orchestras along Western European lines. Adolphe Niel, then France's Defence Minister, selected Lemaire to take up the post.

Once in Iran, Lemaire procured western instruments and organized the training of military musicians at the Dar ul-Funun, where his students included Darvish Khan, and Gholam Reza Minbashian (Salar Mo'azez), a leading pioneer of Western classical music in Iran, as well as his son Nasrollah Minbashian. At the request of the shah he also composed the first Iranian national anthem and other military pieces. Lemaire was to spend the rest of his life in Iran but sent piano arrangements of classical Persian music back to Paris where the vogue for orientalism made them popular. In November 1906, three months before his death, he became the first Worshipful Master of the Réveil de l'Iran, the first regularly affiliated Masonic Lodge to operate in Iran. Lemaire died in Tehran at the age of 65.

Mirza Ali-Akbar Khan Naqqashbashi's translations of Lemaire's lessons into Persian were the country's first introduction to European music. The music department where he taught later became an independent music college providing training in Western martial music.

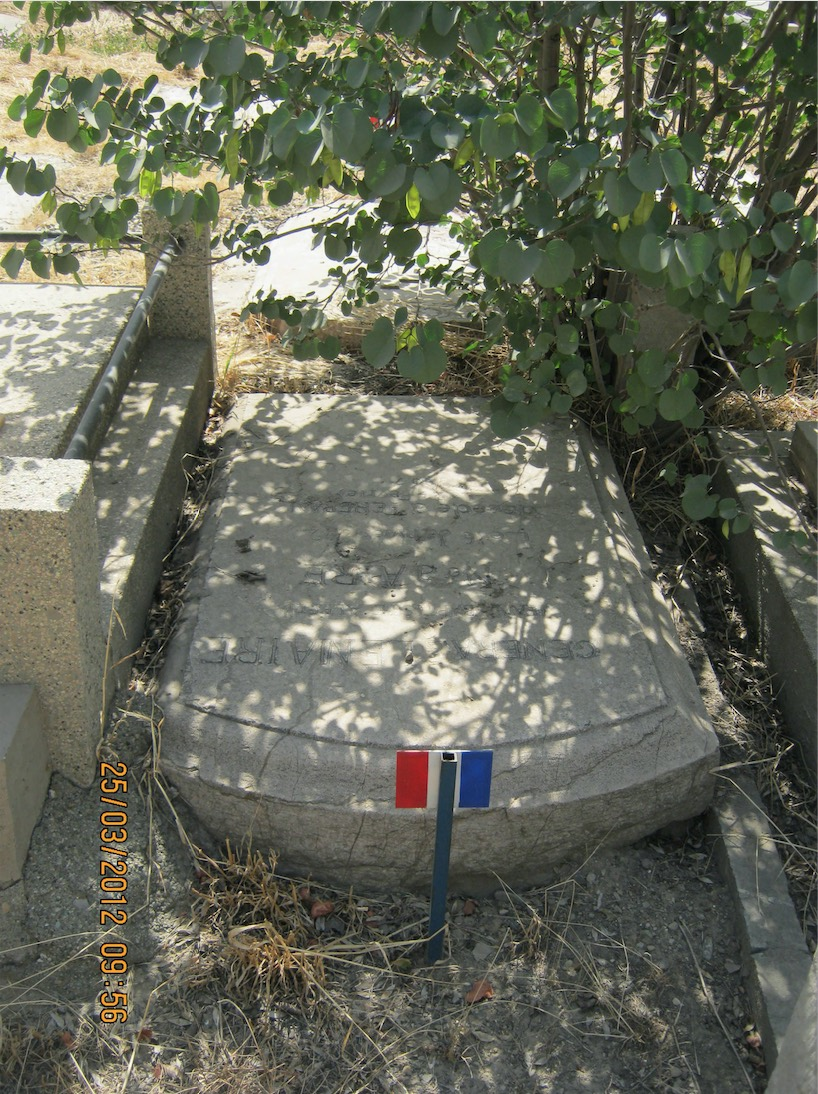
The grave of Alfred Jean-Baptiste Lemaire
