= Peyman Soltani =

Composer, conductor, and musician

- پیمان سلطانی
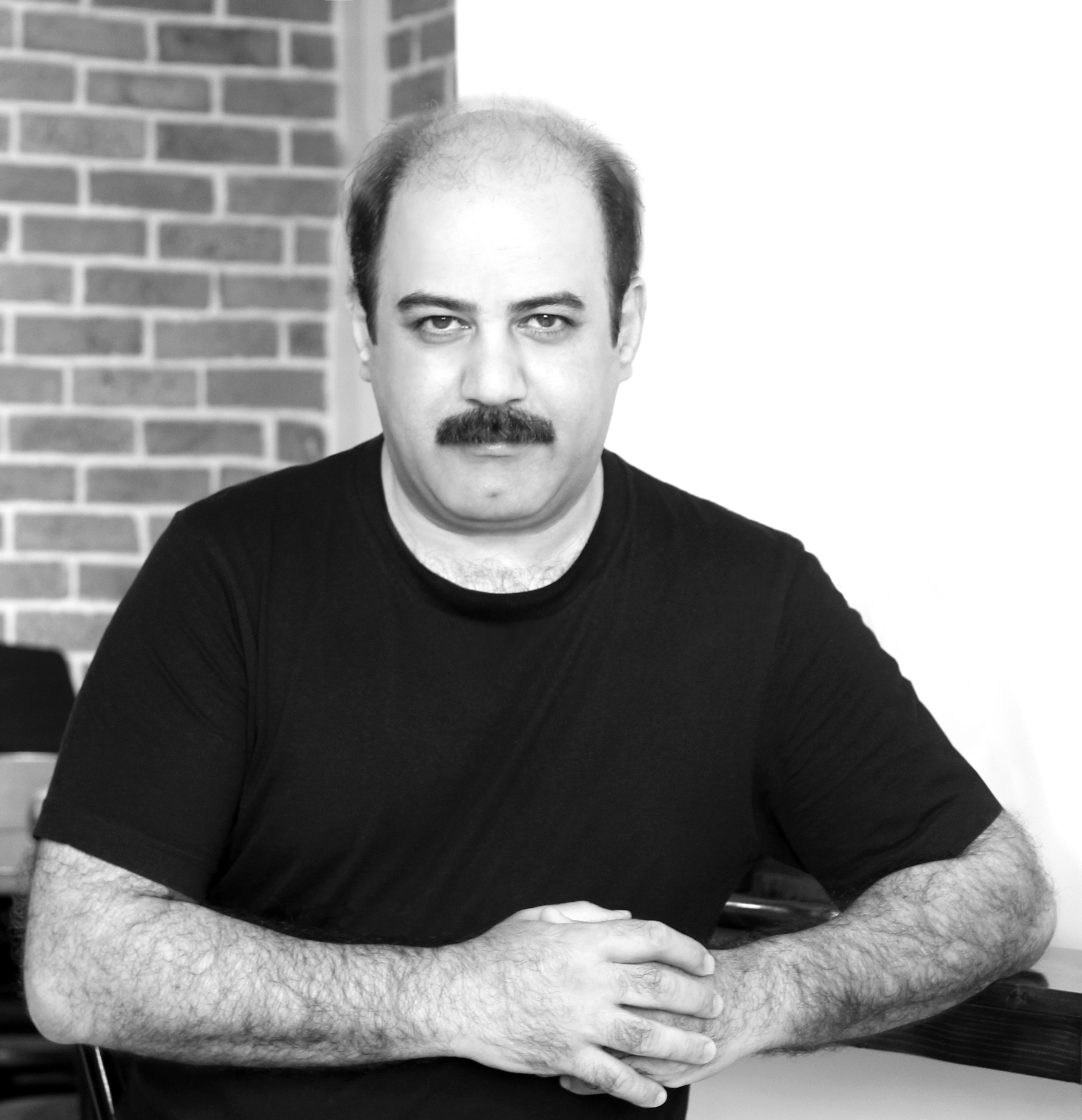
- Peyman Soltani
- Pronunciation: Peymân Soltâni
- Born: Peyman Soltani; 17 January 1971 (age 55); Tabriz, Pahlavi Iran
- Occupations: composer; conductor; musician; music theorist
- Known for: musician, music theorist, conductor
- Notable work: Arash-e-Kamangir, Babak's Narrative Poem, Iraneh Khānom, Khosravāni, Goft-o-Shenid, Vashtan, Azādi (Freedom), Iran-e-Javan (Vatanam), Another Khayyam
- Mother: Farkhondeh Hajizadeh
- Website: peymansoltani.com

Peyman Soltani (Persian: پیمان سلطانی, Peymân Soltâni; born 17 January 1971 in Iran) is a Persian composer, orchestra conductor, instrumentalist and critic. He is currently living in Tehran.

== Life ==
He started learning music and painting in workshops on national TV and Radio in Iran and in the free classes offered by the Ministry of Culture and Arts in 1977. He began his primary education in Aryamehr School in Kerman in 1979. At 16 years of age, he came to Tehran to study graphics. Then he went to Armenia to continue his graduate studies in music composition. Music has always been the pillar of his life. He started playing musical instruments in a self-taught manner, then continued playing under the supervision of some famous Iranian masters such as Emmanuel Melik Aslānian, Farāmarz Pāyvar, Dr. Mohammad Taghi Massoudieh and Farhad Fakhreddini as well as some European and Armenian professors like Thomas Christian David and Yuri Davytyān. As far as philosophy and aesthetics are concerned, he has benefited from Dr. Reza Baraheni and Dr. Manuchehr Badiei.
Ever since his youth, besides learning music, he has taught music playing, composing basics, form, and analysis, and understanding the 20th century and the nations' music. He has been the art director of several publications, such as Vistar, Agra, Sorna, Daricheh and Jamedaran publications, and the music editor of the music and poetry desks in some literary periodicals such as Baya, Ghal o maghal, and the editor-in-chief of Changi music journal and Sorna music quarterly since 1994.
In the early 90s, he organized two music ensembles: Shabānroud, with his students, and Shenidastān, with the young instrumentalists. He also established the Aghaz Music Society in 1995. Since 1989 he has performed many concerts alone or with various ensembles. Soltani became the manager of Iran's first Audio Music House in 1998. Due to some changes in the municipality's management, it was closed down permanently after a year and a half. He founded the museum of Avaha & Navaha in Shiraz in 2004 and served as its manager for three years. He is currently the conductor of Iranian Melal (Nations) Symphony Orchestra, music director of ICOM in Iran, in charge of the International Department of the Iranian Music Museum, and the Director of Online Music Museum and Women of Music websites as well.

In his former philosophical and critical writing, Peyman Soltani was a follower of analytical philosophy (Existentialists). In the musical sphere, at the beginning of his musical works, he was a follower of (modernist and postmodernist) composers associated with the Darmstadt school. Still, recently he has been seeking an identity in his works. His other activities include publishing poetry, criticism, and graphic designs.

== Works ==
- Iraneh Khānom
- Khayyāmi Digar
- Arash Kamāngir
- Azādi (Freedom)
- Raghse Sharghi (Eastern Dance)
- Zanāneye Pārsi
- Yādegāre Leyli
- Doore sharghi
- Bakhtiāri Rhapsody
- Nesyān(Amnesia)
- Golkoo
- Khosravāni

== See also ==
- Persian Symphonic Music
