= The Master and Margarita (disambiguation) =

The Master and Margarita is a novel by Mikhail Bulgakov.

The Master and Margarita may also refer to the adaptations of the novel:

- The Master and Margarita (1988 TV series), a Polish television series
- Der Meister und Margarita, a 1989 opera by York Höller
- The Master and Margarita (1994 film), a Russian film
- The Master and Margarita (miniseries), a 2005 Russian television miniseries
- The Master and Margarita (2024 film), a Russian film

== See also ==
- The Master and Margaret (1972 film), an Italian-Yugoslav film
- Pilate and Others, a 1972 German film based on the novel
