= The Master and Margarita (1988 TV series) =

- The Master and Margarita (1988)
- Also known as: Mistrz i Malgorzata
- Created by: Maciej Wojtyszko
- Based on: The Master and Margarita by Mikhail Bulgakov
- Starring: Anna Dymna; Władysław Kowalski; Gustaw Holoubek; Zbigniew Zapasiewicz; Janusz Michałowski
- Country of origin: Poland
- No. of seasons: 1
- No. of episodes: 4

Production
- Running time: 4 x 52 minutes

Original release
- Release: March 20, 1990

The Master and Margarita (Polish: Mistrz i Małgorzata) is a Polish television production of Polish Film Producers Teams (Zespoły Polskich Producentów Filmowych), based on the novel of the same name by Mikhail Bulgakov.

== Background ==
Director and screenwriter of this adaptation is Maciej Wojtyszko.

== The story ==
=== Three layers ===
The film is an adaptation of the novel The Master and Margarita written by the Russian author Mikhail Bulgakov. Three storylines are interwoven.

- The first one is a satire of the ‘30s in the 20th century, the period during which Joseph Stalin is in power in the Soviet Union. The demon Woland comes to Moscow to have his annual Spring Ball of the Full Moon. Together with his demonic suite, he challenges the corrupt lucky ones, bureaucrats and profiteers of that period in an hilarious way.
- The second one is set in the biblical Yershalaim, and describes the inner struggle of Pontius Pilate before, during and after the conviction and execution of Yeshua Ha Nozri.
- The third one tells the love story between a nameless writer in Moscow in the ’30s and his lover Margarita. The Master has written a novel on Pontius Pilate, a subject which was taboo in the officially atheistic Soviet Union.

=== Differences with the novel ===
This series follows faithfully the storyline of Bulgakov's original novel, except for the nighttime scenes. While many scenes in Bulgakov's novel are playing in the dark, it's always daytime in this adaptation. Due to the limited budget, Wojtyszko said he had focused on good acting rather than on special effects. At least one character was 'added' by the staff of Mr. Wojtyszko to the number appearing in the original novel by Bulgakov i. e. a 'Ms. Karaulina' (featured by Ms. Krystyna Sienkiewicz (1935-2017) a 'mother' (as she describes herself at the Griboyedov) and a writer, who 'wrote five kolkhoz novels in sixteen years with no leave', whose 'windows face a WC' and who is 'chased around the flat by a lunatic with axt'. As well, Anna Richardovna (featured by Ms. Magdalena Zawadzka, born 1944) is falsely described at the end of Part 2 as 'the secretary to Proleshnev' actually being one to Prokhor Petrovich.

== Episodes ==
1. The Black Magic Séance
2. The Master
3. Margarita
4. Saying goodbye

== Credits ==
- Director: Maciej Wojtyszko
- Screenplay: Maciej Wojtyszko
- Production: CWPiFTV Poltel (Warszawa)
- Camera:Dariusz Kuc

== Main cast ==
- Margarita: Anna Dymna
- Master: Władysław Kowalski
- Woland: Gustaw Holoubek
- Berlioz: Igor Przegrodzki
- Bezdomny: Jan Jankowski
- Pontius Pilate: Zbigniew Zapasiewicz
- Koroviev: Janusz Michałowski
- Azazello: Mariusz Benoit
- Yeshua: Tadeusz Bradecki
- Behemoth: Zbigniew Zamachowski
- Hella: Maria Probosz

== Soundtrack ==
All tracks composed by Zbigniew Karnecki.

== See also ==
The Master and Margaret, a 1972 Italian-Yugoslav film, also loosely based on Bulgakov's novel.
