= Bulgakov House (Moscow) =

Former residence of Mikhail Bulgakov

Coordinates: 55°46′00.87″N 37°35′34.48″E

The Bulgakov House
- Музей - театр "Булгаковский Дом"
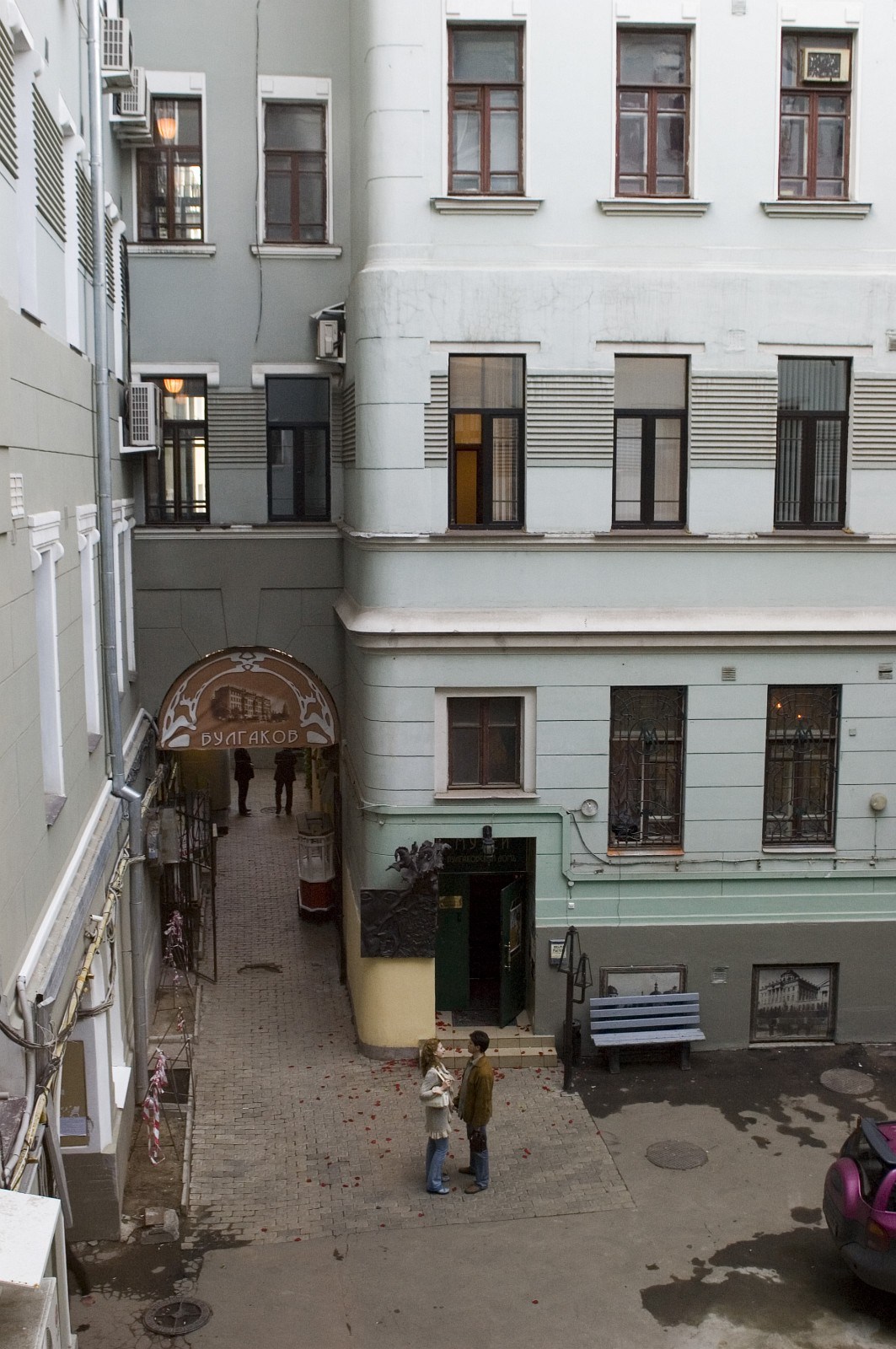
- Location: Bolshaya Sadovaya ulitsa 10; Moscow
- Collection size: Documents and personal belongings of Mikhail Bulgakov
- Director: Nikolay Golubov
- Public transit access: Metro Mayakovskaya

The Bulgakov House (Russian: Музей-театр «Булгаковский дом») is situated on the ground floor of Bolshaya Sadovaya ulitsa no. 10 in Moscow, Russia, in the building where the Soviet writer Mikhail Bulgakov used to live, and in which some major scenes of his novel The Master and Margarita are set. The museum was established as a private initiative on May 15, 2004.

In the same building, in apartment number 50 on the fourth floor, is a second museum that keeps alive the memory of Bulgakov, the Bulgakov Museum in Moscow. This second museum is a government initiative and was founded on March 26, 2007.

Other locations playing a role in the novel The Master and Margarita are situated in the neighborhood of the Bulgakov House, like the Patriarch's Ponds, the Variety Theatre, and the Griboedov writers' house.

The Bulgakov House open every day from 13:00 to 23:00 hours, and on Fridays and Saturdays until 01:00. Entrance is free.

== The building ==
The building was originally intended for luxury rental apartments and was built between 1902 and 1905 by order of the Russian millionaire Ilya Pigit, owner of the tobacco company Ducat. The building was erected in the so-called Russian Art Nouveau style at a time when Moscow came into full bloom and many new avenues, lined with trees, were constructed. The Bolshaya Sadovaya ulitsa or Big Garden street was one of those avenues, and was part of the Garden Ring around the center of Moscow. In June 1917, just before the October Revolution, Ilya Pigit sold the building to a private real estate company. It was a good move, because after the revolution, the new Soviet regime claimed the house to transform it into one of the first communal apartments buildings in Moscow. In 1938, the building lost much of its original charm as the front fence was removed to make way for a broadening of the street.

In September 1921, the Soviet author Mikhail Bulgakov settled in apartment number 50 on the fourth floor with his first wife Tatyana Nikolaevna Lappa. Bulgakov, who was a fierce opponent of the Soviet regime, described his aversion to the communal apartments, and especially the apartment number 50 Bolshaya Sadovaya ulitsa 10 as follows:

On Bolshaya Sadovaya street

Stands a great block of apartments.
In the block live our brothers:

The organized proletariat.

Bulgakov used this building as one of the most important locations in his renowned novel The Master and Margarita, in which he described it as The Evil Apartment (Diana Burgin/Richard Pevear and Larissa Volokhonsky) or The Haunted Flat (Michael Glenny).

In The Master and Margarita, Bulgakov did not situate the building at number 10, using instead the number 302-bis, to denounce the complexity of the Soviet administration in his time.

In the summer of 1924, Bulgakov managed things in such way that he could move to the fifth floor, to the much quieter apartment number 34, of which he also used some characteristics in his description of apartment number 50 in the novel. His wife Tatyana Lappa would later realize that Bulgakov had arranged the move to make sure that she would not be left alone in an unpleasant environment, as a few months later, Bulgakov himself left the building to move in with Lyubov Evgenyeva Belozerskaya, whom he would marry in April 1925.

Once there was a café in the basement of this building, named Pegasus' Stables, in which the Russian poet Sergei Yesenin met his later wife, the American dancer Isadora Duncan.

== History of the museum ==
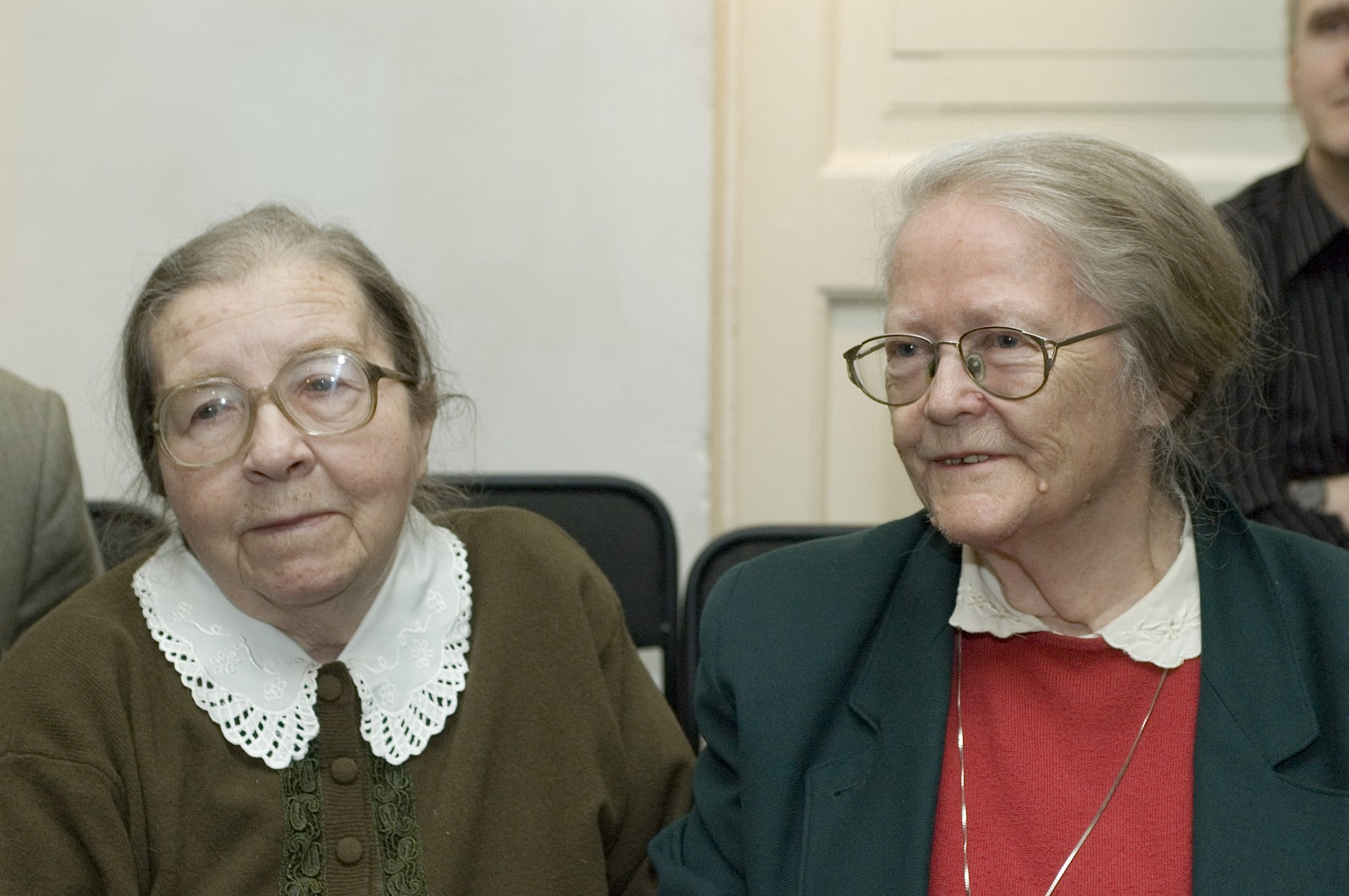
Bulgakov's nieces Varvara M. Svetlayeva and Yelena A. Zemskaya at the Bulgakov House

Long before there was a Bulgakov museum in Moscow, Bolshaya Sadovaya ulitsa 10 was already a sort of pilgrimage for fans of the writer. The wall of the staircase leading to the apartment number 50 was overwhelmed with graffiti, drawings and quotes from The Master and Margarita.

Between 1984 and 1986, the house, the staircase, and the apartment were subject of a battle between the official bodies, the caretaker of the building, and the creators of the graffiti. The graffiti were regularly removed and painted over, but the fans came back again and again to put new graffiti. The caretaker changed the entrance security code several times, but it was always broken. Eventually the official authorities gave up. In the spring of 1988, the city government gave permission to establish an official Bulgakov museum, but it would be some time before that actually happened.

In the early 21st century, the whole block was renovated, and in early 2004, a handful of enthusiastic Bulgakov adepts managed to establish a museum at Bolshaya Sadovaya number 10. On 15 May 2004, the anniversary of Mikhail Bulgakov, the Bulgakov House was opened. Since the apartment number 50 was not available at that time, the Bulgakov House took up residence on the ground floor of the building.

== Activities ==
=== The Bulgakov House ===
The actual museum has an extensive collection of documents, photographs, and personal belongings of Mikhail Bulgakov, which are permanently exhibited in the different areas.

Exhibitions
The museum regularly organizes exhibitions of works by well-known Russian and foreign artists, with a particular focus on illustrators of the works of Mikhail Bulgakov.
Festivals
The museum is known for its festivals, and in particular for the annual celebration of the birthday of Mikhail Bulgakov.
Excursions
The museum organizes regular walks along the places which Mikhail Bulgakov describes in his works, including the nearby Patriarch's Ponds. Particularly appreciated are the animated night walks, where participants meet living characters from the works of Bulgakov. The latter also happens on the tours with Tram 302-bis, which rides three times a day from Thursday to Sunday.
Library
The Bulgakov House has an extensive library, not only of works by and about Bulgakov, but also about the political, social, economic, and cultural context in which the writer lived. Visitors can consult or purchase these works.
Scientific work
The Bulgakov House regularly organizes information and discussion meetings on the works and life of Bulgakov and also supports scholars and students studying them.

Elena Martynyuk, the house photographer, realized a huge photographic project on The Master and Margarita. For the project, which lasted three years, 70 shootings were organized and more than 1,000 photos made. The photos were made at the locations described in the novel, like the roof of the Pashkov House and in the Bulgakov House. The scenes of the Variety Theatre were photographed at the Moscow Art Theatre MKhAT, where Bulgakov's pieces were performed and where he also used to work himself. In the spring of 2013, a special edition of the novel was published with photos of the project.

On the Night of the Museums, which are organized in Moscow once a year, the Bulgakov House is one of the major crowd pullers. Every year it makes a reality of what Bulgakov described himself in The Master and Margarita: "By this wall a queue of many thousands clung in two rows, its tail reaching to Kudrinskaya Square".

=== Café 302-bis ===
The Cafe 302-bis is a cozy corner in the Bulgakov House where visitors can relax with drinks and take in the atmosphere of the '30s.

=== Theatre Boo...! ===
Theatre Boo...! began as a group of young actors who gave life to the characters from the novels of Bulgakov, which participants of the excursions could encounter on their trips through Moscow. In addition, the young actors also give performances of mainly improvisational theatre.

=== Theatre M.A. Bulgakov ===
The Theatre M. A. Bulgakov is a small but very beautiful auditorium with 126 seats. Several times a year performances are offered of plays by Bulgakov or theatre adaptations of his novels. An often seen guest is the theater company of the famous Russian director Sergei Aldonin.

=== Behemoth ===
One of the eye-catchers at the Bulgakov House is a permanent resident of the house who can count on much popularity with visitors: a big, black cat named Behemoth after one of the characters of The Master and Margarita.

== Opponents and rivals ==
As the Bulgakov operation became more successful, it also attracted opponents and rivals.

- One of the toughest opponents of the Bulgakov House is the self-proclaimed "keeper of the Russian cultural heritage," Aleksandr Morozov, who regards the work of Bulgakov as satanic. On December 22, 2006, he entered the repository of the Bulgakov and the studio of its children's theatre and destroyed all of its contents. The damage of the vandalism totaled approximately 100,000 USD. The Bulgakov House was forced to close its doors but reopened not long after on January 1, 2007.
- There came also opposition from official corners. The well-known writer, critic, and historian Marietta Chudakova was given permission by the Department of Culture of Moscow to transform the apartment number 50 into an official museum. The Museum M.A. Bulgakov was inaugurated on May 15, 2007. Inna Mishina, Chudakova's sister, was appointed as the first director. However, the official museum could hardly develop the same dynamics as its downstairs neighbors and fell prey to internal struggles. On May 14, 2012, a day before the fifth anniversary of the museum, the Department of Culture announced that Mishina was fired and that a competition would be organized to install a new management team. On October 9, 2012, the management was entrusted to the Italian architect Gabriele Filippini. Upon his appointment, Filippini announced that he had ambitious plans for the museum and its immediate vicinity, and that he was willing to work with anyone who wished to honor the legacy of Bulgakov, including the Bulgakov House and Marietta Chudakova.

== Literature ==
- Bulgakov, Michail, The Master and Margarita, Translated by Michael Glenny, Everyman's Library, New York, 1967. ISBN 0-67941-04-65
- Bulgakov, Michail, The Master and Margarita, Translated by Diana Burgin, Vintage Books, New York, 1996. ISBN 0-67976-08-06
- Bulgakov, Michail, The Master and Margarita, Translated by Richard Pevear and Larissa Volokhonsky, Penguin Classics, New York, 1997. ISBN 0-14118-01-45
- Bushnell, John, A Popular Reading of Bulgakov: Explication des Graffiti, Slavic Review, Vol. 47, No. 3. (Autumn, 1988), pp. 502–511
- Curtis, Julie, Manuscripts Don't Burn. Mikhail Bulgakov, a Life in Letters and Diaries, The Overlook Press, Woodstock, New York, 1991. ISBN 0-87951-462-0
- Proffer, Ellendea, Bulgakov. Life and Work, Ardis Publishers, Ann Arbor, 1984. ISBN 0-88233-198-1
