= Mikhail Bulgakov Museum =

Museum in Kyiv, Ukraine

Mikhail Bulgakov House
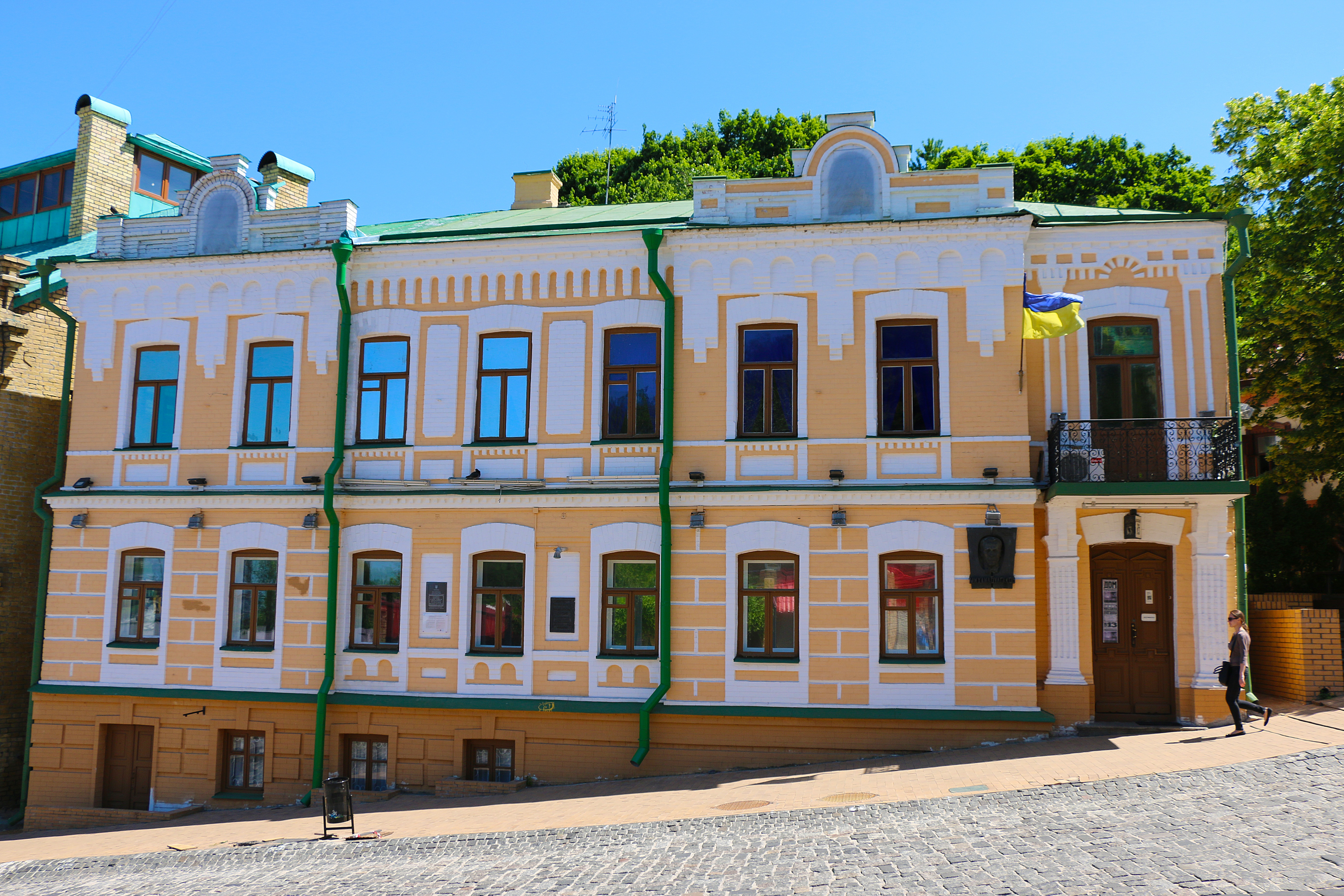

- Location within Ukraine

General information
- Location: Kyiv, Ukraine
- Coordinates: 50°27′39″N 30°30′53″E
- Opened: May 15, 1991
- Owner: A. Konchakovskyi

Website
- http://www.bulgakov.org.ua

Immovable Monument of National Significance of Ukraine
- Official name: Будинок, у якому жив письменник М. П. Булгаков (The house where the writer M. P. Bulgakov lived)
- Type: History
- Reference no.: 260002-Н

The Mikhail Bulgakov Museum (officially known as Literature-Memorial Museum to Mikhail Bulgakov, commonly called the Bulgakov House or Lystovnychyi House) (Note: Ukrainian: Літературно-меморіальний музей Михайла Булгакова, Дім Булгакова, Дім Листовничого, romanized: Literaturno-memorialnyi muzei Mykhaila Bulhakova, Dim Bulhakova, Dim Lystovnychoho) is a museum in Kyiv, Ukraine, dedicated to Kyiv-born Russian writer Mikhail Bulgakov.

Commenced in February 1989, and opened on May 15, 1991, for the 100th anniversary of the writer's birth, the museum is located at No.13 on the Andriivskyi Descent and contains an exposition of nearly 2500 pieces that include Bulgakov's belongings, books, postcards, and photos — conveying the life and creativity of the writer and his surroundings. The atmosphere of the house reflects the writer's life — as a secondary school pupil, student of medicine, family doctor, and writer — when Bulgakov wrote The White Guard, The Master and Margarita, and Theatre Love Story.

The building was erected in 1888 and designed by architect N. Gardenin, and thoroughly renovated before the opening of the museum. A memorial plaque with Bulgakov's portrait hangs on the front of the building. Bulgakov's 1925 novel The White Guard makes vivid references to the Andriyivskyy Descent, and the current plaque of the address at No.13 displays the street name the writer used in his book (No.13 Andreevsky spusk). Inna Konchakovskaia (1902–85), daughter of the owner (who was a hero of that Bulgakov novel) and niece of composer Witold Maliszewski, preserved this unique house in Kyiv in the hard Soviet times.

The museum staff conducts considerable studies and research, publishes unreleased material, and holds book-club meetings.

In June 2014, the museum posted the following announcement: "All persons supportive of the military occupation of Ukraine are discouraged from visiting the museum — The Mikhail Bulgakov Museum Administration."

Following the 2022 Russian invasion of Ukraine, there were calls in Ukraine to close down the museum, since Bulgakov allegedly opposed Ukrainian statehood and can not be considered a Ukrainian writer. Oleksandr Tkachenko, the then culture minister, as well as Liudmyla Gubianuri, the museum director, opposed the calls. The National Writers' Union of Ukraine proposed to close the museum and create a museum of the composer Oleksandr Koshyts instead.

On 4 June 2026 the monument to Bulgakov on Andriivskyi Descent was dismantled.

== See also ==
- Bulgakov museum in Moscow
- Heart of a Dog
- The Master and Margarita
