= The Master and Margarita (2024 film) =

2024 Russian fantasy-drama film

- Official film poster
- Russian: Мастер и Маргарита
- Directed by: Michael Lockshin
- Screenplay by: Michael Lockshin; Roman Kantor
- Based on: The Master and Margarita by Mikhail Bulgakov
- Produced by: Ruben Dishdishyan; Leonard Blavatnik; Anatoly Akimenko
- Starring: Yevgeny Tsyganov; Yuliya Snigir; Claes Bang; August Diehl
- Cinematography: Maxim Zhukov
- Edited by: Dmitri Komm; Dmitriy Slobtsov
- Music by: Anna Drubich
- Production companies: Mars Media; Amedia
- Distributed by: Atmosfera Kino
- Release date: 25 January 2024
- Running time: 157 minutes
- Country: Russia
- Languages: Russian; German; Latin; Aramaic
- Budget: 1.2 billion ₽
- Box office: 2.33 billion ₽

The Master and Margarita (Russian: Мастер и Маргарита, romanized: Master i Margarita) is a Russian drama-fantasy film directed by Michael Lockshin and based on Mikhail Bulgakov's novel of the same name, which is widely considered one of the most important Russian-language novels of the 20th century with over 100 million copies sold worldwide. The film stars August Diehl as Woland, a diabolical foreigner who visits Moscow, Yevgeny Tsyganov as the eponymous Master, Yuliya Snigir as Margarita, the Master's mistress and Claes Bang as Pontius Pilate.

The movie was shot in 2021, but its release was delayed several times because of Russia's invasion of Ukraine and finally premiered on January 25, 2024. The movie received mostly positive reviews from both film critics and audiences and became the highest-grossing film released with an 18+ content rating ever in Russia and #7 in all time box office receipts, with over 6 millions admissions and 2.4 billion rubles, despite the attacks of Russia's state media, propagandists and officials against the movie, which eventually led to its censorship.

In 2025 the film came out in movie theaters in Germany, Austria, France, Italy, Sweden, Czech Republic, South Korea and other countries. The film’s release in English-language territories has been delayed due to ongoing litigation to get the US rights and is now scheduled for a theatrical release January 2027.

== Premise ==
In 1930s Moscow, a prominent writer's works are suddenly censored by the Soviet state and the premiere of his theatrical play about Pontius Pilate is canceled for ideological reasons. He is expelled from the Union of Soviet Writers, and quickly turns into an outcast with no means to survive.

Inspired by Margarita, his mistress, he begins working on a new novel in which all the characters are satirically reinterpreted from his life. The novel's central character is Woland, a mystical dark force who visits Soviet Moscow as a tourist, and avenges all those who caused the writer's downfall.

As the writer sinks himself deeper and deeper into his novel, adding himself and Margarita as characters, he gradually stops noticing as the border between reality and his imagination fades away.

== Cast ==
- August Diehl as Woland, the Devil who visits Moscow
- Yevgeny Tsyganov as the Master, a writer desperate to survive
- Yuliya Snigir as Margarita, the Master's mistress
- Claes Bang as Pontius Pilate, the main character of the Master's play
- Yuri Kolokolnikov as Korovyev, Woland's right-hand man
- Aleksey Rozin as Azazello, a sharpshooter in Woland's entourage
- Polina Aug as Hella, a succubus in Woland's entourage / Gala, an aspiring actress
- Yura Borisov as the voice of Behemoth, Woland's cat
- Leonid Yarmolnik as Dr Stravinsky, the head of the insane asylum
- Jana Sekste as Praskovya Fedorovna, the nurse in the insane asylum
- Igor Vernik as George Bengalsky, the People's Artist of the USSR
- Marat Basharov as Stepan Likhodeyev, the director of the theatre
- Aleksei Guskov as Boris Maigel, the former baron who now serves as the NKVD agent
- Yevgeny Knyazev as Mikhail Berlioz, the editor-in-chief of the literary magazine
- Danil Steklov as Ivan Bezdomny, a naive young poet that Woland first meets in Moscow,
- Aleksandr Yatsenko as Aloisy Mogarych, a scriptwriter and a friend of the Master
- Dmitriy Lysenkov as Osaf Latunsky, one of the critics who destroys the Writer's career
- Pavel Vorozhtsov as Ivan Varenukha, the house-manager of the theatre
- Valery Kukhareshin as Grigory Rimsky, the treasurer of the theatre
- Arkady Koval as Archibald Archibaldovich, the director of the restaurant
- Nikita Tarasov as the NKVD investigator
- Sofya Sinitsyna as Frida
- Aaron Vodovoz as Yeshua Ha-Nozri, a character of the Master's play
- Makram Khoury as Caiaphas, a character of the Master's play
- Sergei Frolov as the skeptical viewer
- Denis Pyanov as Nikanor Bosoy, the chairman of the house committee
- Aleksandr Tyutin as Zheldybin, the chairman of the Union of Soviet Writers
- Sergey Belyayev as Andrei Sokov, the barman at the theatre
- Agrippina Steklova as Nastasya Nepremenova, member of the Union of Soviet Writers (writing under the pen-name Bosun George)
- Valentin Samokhin as Hieronymus Poprikhin, a novelist and a member of the Union of Soviet Writers
- Olga Ozollapinya as Pelagea Antonovna, Bosoy's wife
- Yevgeny Kharitonov as the doorman of the Dramlit House
- Ilya Slanevsky as Gindin, the actor who played Yeshua in the theatre
- Mariya Dubina as Anna
- Oleg Nazarov as Vyacheslav, Margarita's husband
- Dmitry Vorontsov as Jacques, the first guest at Woland's ball

== Production ==
In 2018, the film was announced as being in production, with two major Russian producers helming the project: Ruben Dishdishyan and Igor Tolstunov. Nikolai Lebedev was set to direct. By 2020, however, the project still had not taken off. At some point, Lebedev had left the project.

Instead, Michael Lockshin, director of The Silver Skates, co-wrote a new script with Roman Kantor in 2020 and directed the film in 2021. The new script intertwined the novel with Bulgakov's life. The film had a working title Woland. The producers were Ruben Dishdishyan, Igor Tolstunov and Leonard Blavatnik. 40% of the funding was provided by the Cinema Foundation of Russia.

In July 2021 it was announced that August Diehl will be playing Woland.

Filming began in July 2021 in Moscow, St. Petersburg, and Malta, and concluded in October 2021.

Mars Media announced that the film would be released on January 1, 2023, with Universal Pictures acting as distributor.

In August 2022, it was announced that the release date would be pushed to late 2023, due to Universal Pictures leaving Russia over the 2022 Russian invasion of Ukraine and problems with funding the film's post-production.

In July 2023, it was announced that the films' release would be pushed once again - to 2024. The release date of January 25, 2024 was announced just a short time before the film came out.

In April 2023 it was announced that the title of the film would be The Master and Margarita. Originally the title Woland was floated as a possible one for the CIS release, while The Master and Margarita was the international title.

The characters in the film speak in Russian, German, Latin and Aramaic.

== Reception ==
The film was released to positive reviews from film critics, and hailed as the first successful adaptation of the notoriously "unadaptable" novel. Anton Dolin, one of Russia's most influential film critics called it "the first good adaptation" of Bulgakov's novel and the "best commercial movie in modern Russian history". Other prominent film critics like Andrei Plakhov, as well as Bulgakov academics and cultural figures like Dmitry Bykov and Ekaterina Shulman also praised the film. The Los Angeles Times reviewer called the film "... the first worthy film adaptation of Bulgakov's novel [with] scaldingly relevant parallels to Putin's Russia." It received the independent Russian film critic's award "White Elephant" as Best Picture.

The German and Austrian press reacted with broad acclaim on the film's release in summer of 2025, praising the film's visual opulence, bold adaptation choices, and its mix of satire, fantasy, and political critique. Major outlets such as Die Zeit, Welt am Sonntag, and FAZ highlighted its artistic daring, with some calling it one of the most successful literary adaptations in recent years. They emphasized the film's skillful handling of Bulgakov's complex novel and its timely resonance as both a critique of Soviet history and a reflection on contemporary Russia.

The Italian press such as Corriere della Sera called it “an anti-totalitarian work against censorship,” a remarkable kaleidoscopic film, and L’Occhio del Cineasta highlighted its “ability to transform a complex literary work into a film".

Many viewers noted the timeliness of the film, as the period piece about the 1930s - resonated with news about the rise of censorship and repressions in contemporary Russia. The Guardian noting that "As Russia becomes more repressive, it is possible that Master and Margarita could be one of the last films of its kind, a blockbuster where the criticism of the state lies on the service."

On release day in Russia January 25, 2024, the film opened to 57.3 million rubles. By its second weekend, the film had made 1 billion rubles, according to the Cinema Foundation of Russia. By March 2024, the movie became the highest-grossing movie released with an 18+ content rating ever in Russia, with over 2.3 billion rubles in the box office (over 5 million admissions).

The film was targeted by nationalist activists, propagandists, and Putin's government officials, including Vladimir Solovyev, Margarita Simonyan, Zakhar Prilepin, and Tigran Keosayan who complained about the film's anti-regime stance, and the fact that the Ministry of Culture had provided funding for a film seen as propagating anti-Putin and anti-war ideas, even though it was shot before Russia's full-scale invasion into Ukraine. They demanded a criminal investigation into the film and into Lockshin himself for his vocal pro-Ukrainian views on the Russian invasion of Ukraine. The debates reached Russia's parliament - The State Duma with some deputies calling for a ban of the film and for it to be pulled from movie theaters. Audiences reacted in Russia with even higher attendance, as rumors of the film being censored circulated. However, according to the director, when the propagandists started their attack after seeing the film, the movie had already gained notoriety and success after its first week at the box office, and was based on a beloved classic book, so the authorities ultimately decided to not intervene to stop distribution. The film was later censored without the director's knowledge, with politically sensitive scenes cut out.

The film received a record 14 nominations and 6 wins at the annual Russian Guild of Film Critics Awards, including winning Best Feature Film. It received seven nominations and seven wins at the Russian Film Academy's Nika Awards, including Best Picture. At the same time the official state-sponsored government film awards Golden Eagle totally ignored the film in their nomination because of the director's stance on the war. At the Nika Awards ceremony those receiving the prizes had to agree to not mention the director's name. Despite all the backlash, the film became one of the highest grossing films ever at the Russian box office, and the #1 highest grossing film with an 18+ rating.
