= The Master and Margarita (1994 film) =

- Blu-Ray Disc cover
- Based on: The Master and Margarita by Mikhail Bulgakov
- Starring: Anastasiya Vertinskaya; Viktor Rakov; Valentin Gaft; Sergey Garmash; Mikhail Ulyanov; Aleksandr Filippenko; Viktor Pavlov; Nikolai Burlyayev; Vyacheslav Shalevich; Vladimir Steklov
- Music by: Alfred Schnittke
- Country of origin: Russia
- Original language: Russian

Production
- Running time: 123 minutes (theatrical); 207 minutes (director's cut)

Original release
- Release: 4 April 2011

The Master and Margarita (Мастер и Маргарита) is a Russian film made by director Yuri Kara, based on the novel of the same name by the Russian author Mikhail Bulgakov.

== Background ==
Although the film was made in 1994 (or 1993), it was not released until April 4, 2011, and played only in Russia. Despite its large budget and a well-known cast, the producers decided not to release it because they found the director's cut to be unacceptable. The soundtrack, recorded by Alfred Schnittke, was released on CD.

When journalist Valeriy Kitshin of the Rossiyskaya Gazeta saw the film in a private screening at the Moscow International Film Festival in 2005, he tried to convince the producers to release it. However, Sergey Shilovsky, the grandson of Mikhail Bulgakov's third wife Elena Sergeevna, claimed to have the copyright on Bulgakov's literary inheritance, and asked for payment. Shilovsky eventually sold the rights to producer Scott Steindorff of Stone Village Productions, who commissioned Caroline Thompson to write the script.

A bootleg low-quality version, 200 minutes long, was leaked on the internet in December 2006.

On November 15, 2010, the Russian film distributor Luxor announced that they had bought the rights to the film. It was released on April 4, 2011. Luxor shortened the film to 123 minutes from the original director's cut, which was 207 minutes long. The theatrical version was released on DVD and Blu-ray on May 3, 2011.

== Plot ==
The film is an adaptation of the novel The Master and Margarita by Russian author Mikhail Bulgakov. Three storylines are interwoven. The first is a satire of the 1930s, the period during which Joseph Stalin is in power in the Soviet Union. The devil Woland comes to Moscow to have his annual spring ball of the full moon. He and his companions challenge corrupt bureaucrats and profiteers. The second story, set in Jerusalem, describes the inner struggle of Pontius Pilate before, during, and after the conviction and execution of Jesus. The third part tells the love story between a nameless writer in Moscow in the 1930s and his lover, Margarita. He has written a novel on Pontius Pilate, a subject which was taboo in the officially anti-religious atheistic Soviet Union.

== Soundtrack ==
The "bolero" in the soundtrack references Maurice Ravel's Bolero.

== Cast ==
- Anastasiya Vertinskaya as Margarita
- Viktor Rakov as the Master
- Valentin Gaft as Woland
- Sergey Garmash as Ivan Bezdomny
- Mikhail Ulyanov as Pontius Pilate
- Aleksandr Filippenko as Korovyev
- Viktor Pavlov as Behemoth
- Nikolai Burlyayev as Yeshua Ha-Nozri
- Lev Durov as Matthew Levi
- Igor Vernik as Judas
- Vyacheslav Shalevich as Caiaphas
- Vladimir Steklov as Azazello
- Aleksandra Zakharova as Hella
- Mikhail Danilov as Berlioz (voiced by Sergei Yursky)
- Leonid Kuravlyov as Bosoy
- Vladimir Kashpur as Sokov
- Vadim Zakharchenko as Poplavsky
- Sergei Nikonenko as Likhodeyev
- Boryslav Brondukov as Varenukha
- Yevgeny Vesnik as the psychiatrist
- Igor Kvasha as Dr Stravinsky
- Spartak Mishulin as Archibald Archibaldovich
- Roman Tkachuk as the doorman
- Natalya Krachkovskaya as Bosun George
- Amayak Akopyan as George Bengalsky
- Valery Nosik as Aloisy Mogarych
- Maria Vinogradova as Anna
- Lyudmila Ivanova as Bosoy's wife

== Soundtrack ==
1. Meister und Margarita I - 1:47
2. Voland - 2:26
3. Foxtrot - 1:04
4. Tango - 0:59
5. Marche Funebre - 1:12
6. Boléro (Maurice Ravel) - 15:00
7. Meister und Margarita II - 1:50

All tracks composed by Alfred Schnittke, except the Boléro.
