= Maciej Wojtyszko =

Polish film director and screenwriter

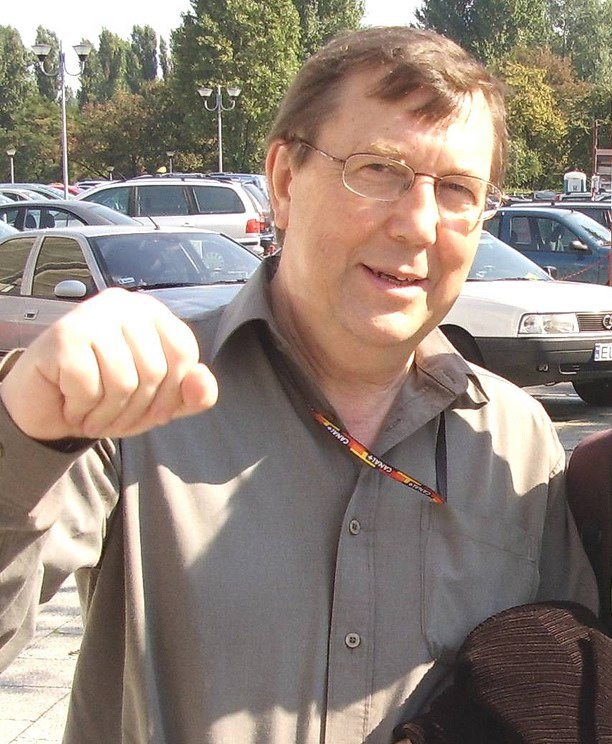
- Born: April 14, 1946 (age 80); Warsaw, Mazowieckie, Poland
- Occupations: film director, screenwriter, author

Maciej Wojtyszko (Polish pronunciation: [ˈmat͡ɕɛj vɔjˈtɨʂkɔ]; born in Warsaw, Mazowieckie on April 14, 1946) is a Polish film director, screenwriter and fiction author.

== Biography ==
Maciej Wojtyszko graduated from the Liceum Technik Teatralnych in Warsaw in 1965. After having studied Philosophy at the University of Warsaw, he went to the National Film School in Łódź, where he graduated as a director in 1973.

He was lecturer at the Aleksander Zelwerowicz State Theatre Academy in Warsaw in 1990-93 and 1999–2002, and Dean of the Halina and John Machulskich Theatre School. He is a member of the Association of Polish Writers.

In 2002, Maciej Wojtyszko was awarded with the Knight's Cross of the Order of the Rebirth of Polish for his “outstanding contribution to the Polish culture”. He is married to the writer Henryka Królikowska and father of the writer Maria Wojtyszko and the actor and screenwriter Adam Wojtyszko.

=== Theatre ===
Maciej Wojtyszko started his career in theatre with Alexander Isaakovich Gelman’s play Bench in 1986 at the Teatr Powszechny in Warsaw, and became known with his stage adaptations of Ilya Ehrenburg’s The Stormy Life of Lasik Roitschwantz at the Athenaeum Theatre in Warsaw and Sławomir Mrożek’s Love in the Crimea at the Old Theatre in Krakow.

=== Film and television ===
As a film director, he started his career in 1984 with a screen adaptation of his own novel Synteza (Synthesis). Internationally, he got noticed with his four-parts mini-series Mistrz i Malgorzata (based on Bulgakov's novel The Master and Margarita) in 1990. After this, Wojtyszko would direct many successful TV-series and films in Poland, like Miodowe lata (1998, based on the American sitcom The Honeymooners) for which he got an award at the Polish Humor Festival in Gdańsk and Ogród Luizy (Louise's Garden, 2007) for which he got the Special Prize of the Jury at the XXXII Polish Film Festival in Gdynia.

=== The author Maciej Wojtyszko ===
As a novelist, Wojtyszko made his debut in 1969 with Szpilki (Pins), a collection of satirical stories. He’s the author of several books for children and adolescents, some of which were adapted as animated television series, like Bromba i inni (Bromba and others, 1975) and Tajemnica szyfru Marabuta (The Secret Cipher of the Marabout, 1978). A typical element of his children's books are the bizarre main characters facing with existential problems. “I want to familiarize children with the amazing phenomenon of existence. All my books are about the fact that we live and enjoy life”, Wojtyszko said.

== Theatre plays ==
- 1991 – Klub Pickwicka (The Pickwick Club, Teatr Powszechny, Warsaw)
- 1990 – Shirley Valentine (Teatr Powszechny, Warsaw)
- 1986 – Miłość na Krymie (Love in the Crimea, Teatr Powszechny, Warsaw)
- 1986 – Kandyd (Candide, Teatr Powszechny, Warsaw)
- 1986 – Ławeczka (Bench, Teatr Powszechny, Warsaw)

== Filmography ==
=== Films and TV series ===
- 2010 – Swiety interes (Holy interests, film)
- 2009 – Doreczyciel (The deliverer, TV series)
- 2007 – Ogród Luizy (Louise's Garden, film)
- 2006 – Ale sie kreci! (Go around!, TV series)
- 2004 – Pensjonat Pod Róza (Pension Pod Roza, TV series)
- 2001 – Kocham Klare (I love Klare, TV mini-series)
- 1999-2000 – Miasteczko (Town, TV series)
- 1998 – Miodowe lata (Honeymooners, TV series)
- 1990 – Mistrz i Malgorzata (The Master and Margarita, TV mini-series)
- 1986 – Ognisty aniol (Fire angel, film)
- 1984 – Synteza (Synthesis, film)

=== Cartoons ===
- 1979 – Tajemnica szyfru Marabuta (The Secret Cipher of the Marabout)
- 1974 – Bromba i inni (Bromba and others)
- 1972 – Gżdacz i inni (Gżdacz and others)

== Bibliography ==
=== Novels and stories ===
- 1984 – Synteza (Synthesis)
- 1975 – Antycyponek
- 1969 – Szpilki (Pins)

=== Children's books ===
- 2009 – Bromba i Fikandra wieczór autorski (Bromba and the literary evening of Fikander)
- 2007 – Bromba i psychologia (Bromba and Psychology)
- 2004 – Bromba i filozofia (Bromba and Philosophy)
- 2003 – Bromba i inni (Bromba and others, extended version)
- 1978 – Tajemnica szyfru Marabuta (The Secret Cipher of the Marabout)
- 1977 – Trzynaste piórko Eufemii (The Thirteenth feather of Euphemia, comic strip)
- 1975 – Bromba i inni (Bromba and others)
