= Bulgakov Museum in Moscow =

Museum in Moscow, Russia

Mikhail Bulgakov Museum
- Location within Moscow
- Established: 2007
- Location: Bolshaya Sadovaya ulitsa no. 10, apartment №50. Moscow, Russia
- Coordinates: 55.7669°N 37.593°E
- Director: I. Mishina (И.О.Мишина )
- Website: Bulgakov Museum

The Bulgakov Museum in Moscow is a Writer's house museum which commemorates the life and work of Russian author Mikhail Afanasyevich Bulgakov where he lived in Moscow, Russia. A part of his novel The Master and Margarita is set in the same location. Graffiti art which includes some text from the novel, as well as drawings of its characters, have decorated the external walls and stairwells of the apartment building since the beginning of Perestroika. It is located a few blocks from Patriarch Ponds, the scene of the opening chapter of the novel, where the Moscow city government had planned to erect statues commemorating the novel and is close to Mayakovskaya metro station.

Originally constructed as a rental house by millionaire Ilya Pigit, the owner of the tobacco factory Ducat, the home was fitted for the first working commune after the revolution. The house was visited by dancer Isadora Duncan and poet Sergey Esenin, Alice Koonen and Andrei Bely, Vasily Surikov and bass Fyodor Shaliapin, imaginists and futurists, the members of the artistic group the Jack of Diamonds, and the whole Moscow bohemians, filling up with the proletariat in the early post-revolutionary years. The studios of the artists Pyotr Konchalovsky and Georgy Yakulov, which were situated in the court of the house 10, still remain, and artistic life continued to pulsate there weekly. What occurred in other apartments – Bulgakov described vividly in the stories № 13 – Elpit Rabcommune Building, The Psalm, The Moonshine Lake, and finally in the novel The Master and Margarita.

The communal flat № 50, where Bulgakov and his wife lived during 1921–24, became the prototype of that Odd Flat, where Voland with his court settled, and where that leading to another measurement mysterious stairs is situated. Years passed, and the stairs of the entrance № 6 became a bewitched place: since the 1970s people would go there to sit on those steps, where Annushka found the horse-shoe, to recollect the favourite fragments from the novel, to sing and to dream. The stairs became one of the unofficial cultural centers of Moscow of 1980–90s. In the attic the “Academy of the Hippie” was organized, and the walls of the entrance were covered with drawings, quotations from Bulgakov’s works, declarations of love to Bulgakov and his characters. During these years, the door of the flat № 50 was closed for the fans of Bulgakov: it housed a design office. But in the 1990s the Bulgakov Fund was based there, and then since April 2007 – the only official Bulgakov Museum in Russia.

On December 22, 2006, the museum in Bulgakov's flat was damaged by an anti-satanist protester and disgruntled neighbor, Alexander Morozov.

== See also ==
- Mikhail Bulgakov
- Mikhail Bulgakov Museum
- Heart of a Dog
- The Master and Margarita
