= The Master and Margaret (1972 film) =

- The Master and Margaret (1972)
- Directed by: Aleksandar Petrović
- Written by: Barbara Alberti; Amedeo Pagani; Aleksandar Petrović; Roman Wingarten; Mikhail Bulgakov (Novel)
- Produced by: Arrigo Colombo
- Starring: Alain Cuny; Ugo Tognazzi; Mimsy Farmer
- Cinematography: Roberto Gerardi
- Edited by: Mihailo Ilić
- Music by: Ennio Morricone
- Release date: 1972
- Running time: 95 minutes
- Countries: Italy; Yugoslavia
- Languages: Serbo-Croatian; Italian

The Master and Margaret (Serbo-Croatian: Мајстор и Маргарита, Majstor i Margarita, Italian: Il maestro e Margherita) is a 1972 Italian-Yugoslav fantasy drama film directed and co-written by Aleksandar Petrović, loosely based on Mikhail Bulgakov's 1940 novel of the same name, although it mainly focuses on the parts of the novel set in 1920s Moscow.

It won the Big Golden Arena for Best Film, with Bata Živojinović picking up the Golden Arena for Best Actor at the 1972 Pula Film Festival. The film was selected as the Yugoslav entry for the Best Foreign Language Film at the 45th Academy Awards, but was not accepted as a nominee.

== Cast ==
- Ugo Tognazzi as Master
- Mimsy Farmer as Margarita
- Alain Cuny as Woland
- Bata Živojinović as Korovyev
- Pavle Vuisić as Azazello
- Fabijan Šovagović as Berlioz
- Ljuba Tadić as Pontius Pilate
- Taško Načić as Rimsky
- Danilo Stojković as Bobov
- Fahro Konjhodžić as Lavrovich
- Zlatko Madunić as Oskar Danilovich
- Radomir Reljić as Jesus Christ
- Janez Vrhovec as Latunsky

== See also ==
- List of submissions to the 45th Academy Awards for Best Foreign Language Film
- List of Yugoslav submissions for the Academy Award for Best Foreign Language Film
