= Behemoth (Master and Margarita) =

- The Master and Margarita character
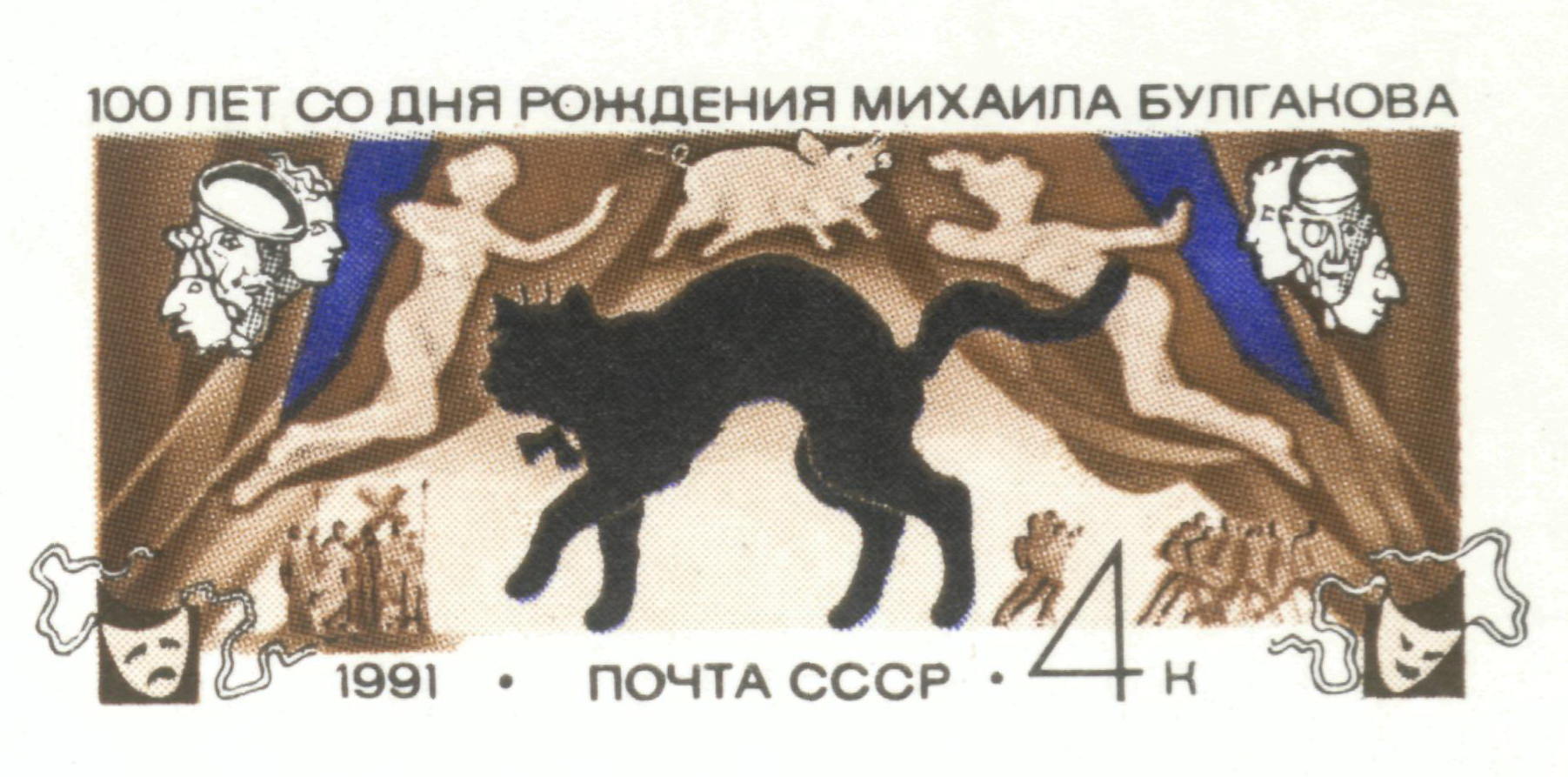
- Created by: Mikhail Bulgakov

In-universe information
- Species: Werecat, demon
- Gender: Male
- Occupation: Jester, page

Behemoth the Cat (Russian: кот Бегемот) is a character from the novel The Master and Margarita by the Russian writer Mikhail Bulgakov. He is an enormous (said to be as large as a hog) demonic black cat who speaks, walks on two legs, and can even transform to human shape for brief periods. He has a penchant for chess, vodka, pistols, and obnoxious sarcasm. He is evidently the least-respected member of Woland's entourage; Margarita boldly takes to slapping Behemoth on the head after one of his many ill-timed jokes, without fear of retribution. He is known for his jokes, which he never stops telling. The Russian word begemot also means hippopotamus; however, his name refers to the legendary Biblical monster.

== In the novel ==
Behemoth is part of Woland's entourage, depicted as a huge black cat. In the Bible, Behemoth is an example of an incomprehensible godly creation and one of the traditional names for a demon. The character is a werecat, who can be "an enormous black cat with cavalry moustache, that walks on two legs" or a "fat shorty in a torn cap" with a catlike face. As a human, he starts a row at the Performance Committee, sets Torgsin and Griboyedov's House on fire, and beats up Varenukha at a public toilet, but most of the time he appears as a cat and shocks people with his human-like behavior.

Bulgakov's Behemoth comically combines philosophical ponderings and manners with roguishness and aggressiveness. He first appears in the scene where Ivan Bezdomny chases Woland and escapes by hopping onto a tram; he then appears in front of a severely hungover Stepan Likhodeyev drinking vodka and chasing it with pickled mushroom; he then, together with Azazello, beats up Varenukha.

Behemoth is close with Korovyev, another member of Woland's entourage. In Chapter 28, "The Last Adventures of Koroviev and Behemoth," the gruesome twosome wreaks havoc around town, sowing confusion at Smolensky marketplace and starting a fire at Griboedov's, a restaurant and meeting house for Russia's literary elite.

== Quotes ==
"Noblesse oblige," said the cat and poured Margarita some clear liquid into a conical glass.
"Is this vodka?" asked Margarita weakly.
The cat jumped resentfully in his chair.
"Forgive me, my lady," he croaked, "Would I ever allow myself to pour vodka for a lady? This is pure alcohol!"

—After Woland's Ball.

"Well, so I sent the telegram. What of it?"

—To Maximilian Andreevich, speaking while in full-on cat form.

"You're not Dostoevsky," said the citizeness, who was getting muddled by Koroviev.
"Well, who knows, who knows," he replied.
"Dostoevsky's dead," said the citizeness, but somehow not very confidently.
"I protest!" Behemoth exclaimed hotly. "Dostoevsky is immortal!"

—When seeking entry at Griboedov's.

"And I really look like a hallucination. Note my silhouette in the moonlight."
The cat got into the shaft of moonlight and wanted to add something else, but upon being asked to keep silent, replied:
"Very well, very well, I'm prepared to be silent. I'll be a silent hallucination."

Behemoth cut a slice of pineapple, salted it, peppered it, ate it, and then tossed off a second glass of alcohol so dashingly that everyone applauded.
