= The Master and Margarita =

Novel by Mikhail Bulgakov, written 1928–1940

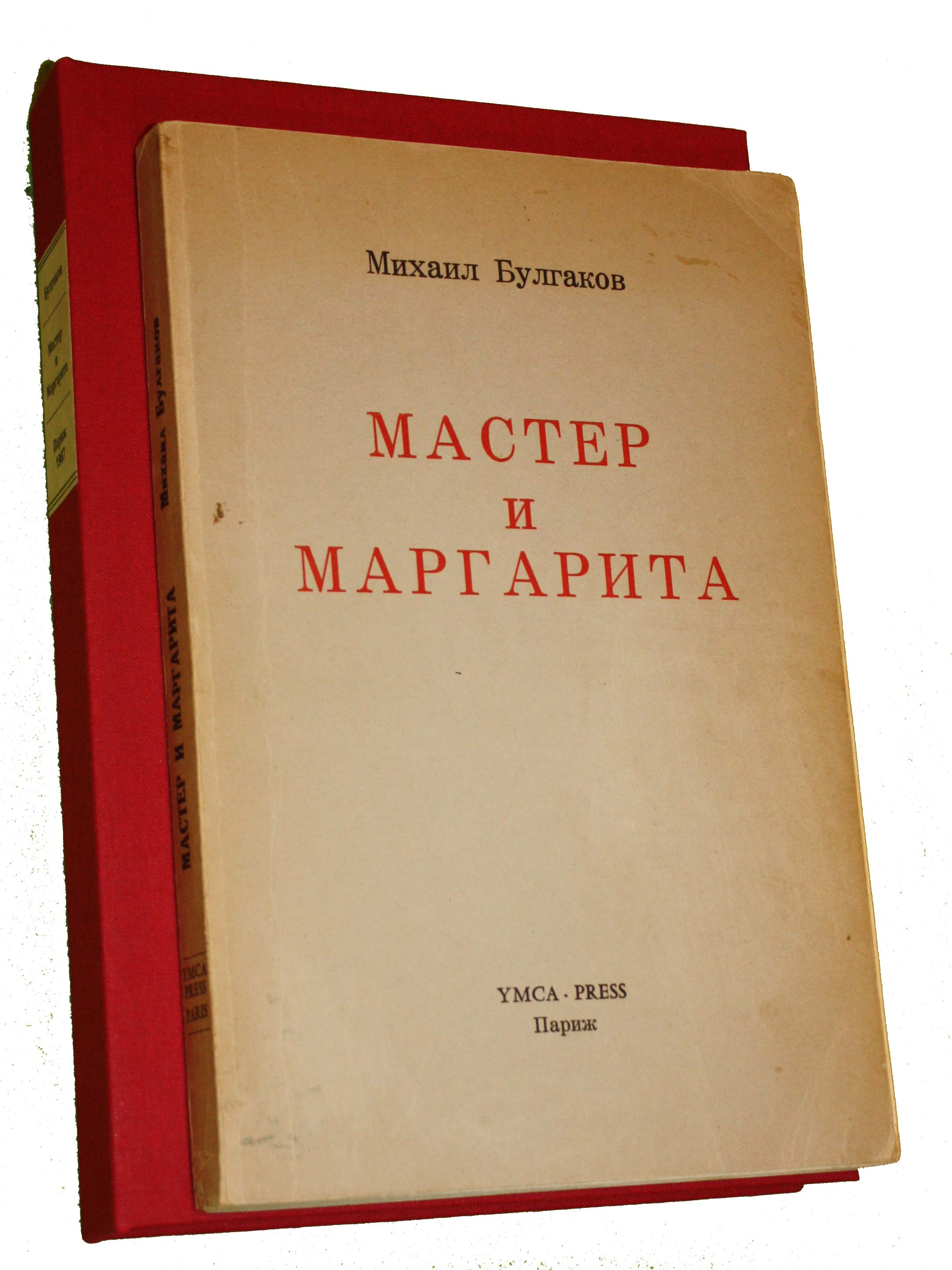
- First edition
- Author: Mikhail Bulgakov
- Original title: Мастер и Маргарита
- Language: Russian
- Genre: Fantasy, farce, supernatural, romance, satire, Modernist literature
- Publisher: YMCA Press
- Publication date: 1966–67 (in serial form), 1967 (in single volume), 1973 (uncensored version)
- Publication place: Paris, France
- English publication date: 1967
- Media type: Print (hard & paperback)
- Pages: 412
- ISBN: 0-14-118014-5 (Penguin paperback)
- OCLC: 37156277

The Master and Margarita (Russian: Мастер и Маргарита, romanized: Master i Margarita) is a novel by Mikhail Bulgakov, written in the Soviet Union between 1928 and 1940. A censored version, with several chapters cut by editors, was published posthumously in Moscow magazine in 1966–1967 by his widow Elena Bulgakova. The manuscript was first published as a book in 1967, in Paris, France. A samizdat version circulated that included parts cut out by official censors, and these were incorporated in a 1969 version published in Frankfurt. The novel has since been published in several languages and editions. It satirizes Soviet bureaucracy and atheism.

The story concerns a visit by the devil and his entourage to the officially atheist Soviet Union. The devil, manifested as one Professor Woland, challenges the Soviet citizens' beliefs about religion and condemns their behavior throughout the book. The Master and Margarita combines supernatural elements with satirical dark comedy and Christian philosophy, defying categorization within a single genre. It is widely acknowledged by critics as one of the greatest novels of the 20th century.

== History ==
Mikhail Bulgakov was born in Kiev on May 15, 1891. He moved to Moscow in 1921. It was in Moscow that he would begin work on The Master and Margarita. Bulgakov was first trained as a physician, which influenced his subsequent works. This is especially evident in The Master and Margarita when the body is described or when characters receive certain injuries. Only later did Bulgakov become a playwright and author. He started writing The Master and Margarita in 1928, but burned the first manuscript in 1930 (just as his character the Master does) facing the harsh reality that he could not see a future as a writer in the Soviet Union at a time of widespread political repression. He restarted the novel in 1931. In the early 1920s, Bulgakov had visited an editorial meeting of an atheist journal. He is believed to have drawn from this to create the Walpurgis Night ball of the novel. He completed his second draft in 1936, by which point he had devised the major plot lines of the final version. He wrote another four versions. When Bulgakov stopped writing four weeks before his death in 1940, the novel had some unfinished sentences and loose ends. His novel was also written amidst heavy criticism for his other works and plays. During this time, he wrote to Stalin asking to be allowed to leave Russia because he felt that the literature critics at the time were proving that Bulgakov's writing did not belong in Russia. This was not approved, which greatly affected the writing of the piece including the descriptions of the Master and his works.

A censored version, with about 12 percent of the text removed and more changed, was first published in Moskva magazine (no. 11, 1966 and no. 1, 1967). A manuscript was smuggled out of the Soviet Union to Paris, where the YMCA Press, celebrated for publishing the banned work of Aleksandr Solzhenitsyn, published the first book edition in 1967. The text, as published in the magazine Moskva, was swiftly translated into Estonian and printed in 1967 by the company Eesti Raamat. This version included many scenes and themes that had previously been censored—for example, Bulgakov's commentary on Soviet moral and governmental corruption. The Italian publisher Einaudi published the book in Russian in 1967 as well. For decades this remained the only printed edition of the novel in book form available in the Soviet Union. The original text of all the omitted and changed parts, with indications of the places of modification, was printed and distributed by hand in the Soviet Union (in the dissident practice known as samizdat). In 1969, the publisher Posev printed a version produced with the aid of these inserts.

The first complete version, prepared by Anna Sahakyants, was published in Russian by Khudozhestvennaya Literatura in 1973. This was based on Bulgakov's last 1940 version, as proofread by the publisher. This version remained the canonical edition until 1989. It is unknown how much of this version was influenced by Elena Shilovskaya, Bulgakov's third and final wife, as she had been in possession of the remaining manuscript notes. Due to the high quantity of manuscripts and drafts, it is near impossible to state which, if any, version of the novel is truly canonical. The last version, based on all available manuscripts, was prepared by Lidiya Yanovskaya.

== Plot ==
The novel has two settings. The first is Moscow during the 1930s, where Satan appears as Professor Woland. He is accompanied by Koroviev, a grotesquely dressed valet; Behemoth, a black cat; Azazello, a hitman; and Hella, a succubus. They target the literary elite and their association "Massolit", (Note: MASSOLIT may be a Soviet-style abbreviation for "Moscow Association of Writers" (Московская ассоциация литераторов), or "Literature for the Masses". According to one translation, it may be a play on words in Russian, translatable into English as "Lotsalit".). Massolit consists of corrupt social climbers: bureaucrats, profiteers, and cynics. The second setting is the Jerusalem of Pontius Pilate, centred around Pilate's trial of Yeshua Ha-Notsri, his recognition of an affinity with (and spiritual need for) Yeshua, and his reluctant acquiescence to Yeshua's execution. The Jerusalem plot of the novel is later revealed to be the novel written by the Master.

Book One

In Moscow, the atheist Massolit chairman Mikhail Berlioz and the young poet Ivan "Homeless" Ponyrev encounter the mysterious Woland. During a debate about the existence of God and the supernatural, Woland tells a story about Pilate's condemnation of Yeshua in Jerusalem. Woland then prophesises Berlioz's imminent death, which comes true. Homeless attempts to report Woland for murder, but his claims about Woland's supernatural powers of prophecy are disbelieved and he is confined to a psychiatric clinic. There, Homeless meets fellow patient "the Master", whose real name is not revealed. The Master is an author whose reputation was ruined after his novel on Pilate and Yeshua was shunned by Moscow's literary elite. The mentally unwell Master admitted himself to the clinic, leaving his heartbroken mistress.

Meanwhile in Moscow, Woland and his retinue secure themselves a show at the Variety Theatre, billing themselves as practitioners of black magic. The audience is amazed when Woland's retinue distribute conjured money and luxury fashion items. Later, the money and clothes disappear, causing chaos and embarrassment. Woland remarks on the Moscovites' pettiness, reflecting the lack of moral progress in Soviet society despite technological advances. Outside the show, Woland's retinue play further supernatural tricks on the Variety Theatre staff, on acquaintances of the deceased Berlioz, and on other unfortunate Muscovites.

Book Two

The Master's lover is revealed to be Margarita, who is despondent after the Master's sudden disappearance. She encounters Azazello, who offers her a magical skin ointment and invites her to meet Satan. Margarita applies the ointment and gains witchlike powers of flight and invisibility. She agrees to be the hostess for Satan's great ball, where she welcomes dark historical figures as they arrive from Hell. In return for her services as hostess, Satan offers to grant her a wish. She asks to be reunited with the Master, who is promptly extracted from the clinic. The couple return to the Master's apartment.

Yeshua, who has read the Master's work, renders judgement that the Master and Margarita should be granted "peace", and Woland is instructed to facilitate this. He sends Azazello to deliver poisoned wine to the Master and Margarita. Their souls journey with Woland's retinue through the afterlife. They encounter Pilate in purgatory, whom the Master frees to join with Yeshua. The Master and Margarita then settle in their eternal, peaceful home.

Epilogue

In Moscow, the havoc wreaked by Woland's retinue is attributed to mass hysteria and hypnosis. Normalcy returns after their departure, although those unfortunate enough to have crossed paths with Woland's retinue (such as the now-professor Ponyrev) experience disquiet every May at full moon, the anniversary of Woland's visit.

== Interpretations ==
=== Response to aggressive atheistic propaganda ===
Some critics suggest that Bulgakov was responding to poets and writers who he believed were spreading atheist propaganda in the Soviet Union, and denying Jesus Christ as a historical person. He particularly objected to the anti-religious poems of Demyan Bedny. The novel can be seen as a rebuke to aggressively "godless people". There is justification in both the Moscow and the Judaea sections of the novel for the entire image of the devil. Bulgakov uses characters from Jewish demonology as a retort to the denial of God in the USSR.

Literary critic and assistant professor at the Russian State Institute of Performing Arts Nadezhda Dozhdikova notes that the image of Jesus as a harmless madman presented in ″Master and Margarita″ has its source in the literature of the USSR of the 1920s, which, following the tradition of the demythologization of Jesus in the works of Strauss, Renan, Nietzsche and Binet-Sanglé, put forward two main themes—mental illness and deception. The mythological option, namely the denial of the historical existence of Jesus, only prevailed in the Soviet propaganda at the turn of the 1920s and 1930s.

=== Reflection of Bulgakov's experiences as a Soviet writer ===
Commentators often note autobiographical elements in the novel. Beyond parallels between fictional characters and Bulgakov's acquaintances, the work has been examined as a reflection of Bulgakov's own psychological troubles spurred by the oppression he faced in his creative career. Some also interpret Ivan and the Master as prototypes of the extremities of Soviet attitudes towards writers. Whereas Ivan is a celebrated rising star supported by MASSOLIT, the Master is a literary outsider who is at once denounced and cast away after submitting his novel for publishing. As a Soviet writer, Bulgakov walked a fine line between the two. Professor of religion and peace studies Alexandra Carroll analyzes Woland through the lens of Jungian psychology, suggesting that Woland serves as a "shadow archetype", which she defines as a "paradoxical figure of evil that appears malevolent, yet works towards an individual's psychological renewal". Other commentators note that Bulgakov's life experiences have also likely influenced the Yershalaim narrative of the novel; Haber and Weeks argue that it is Bulgakov's father's academic work that influenced the narrative, rather than Bulgakov's own view of evil. Weeks interprets this as "Bulgakov's return to elements of his own childhood".

=== Occlusive interpretation ===
Bulgakov portrays evil as being as inseparable from our world, as light is from darkness. Both Satan and Jesus Christ dwell mostly inside people. Jesus was unable to see Judas's treachery, despite Pilate's hints, because he saw only good in people. He could not protect himself, because he did not know how, nor from whom. This interpretation presumes that Bulgakov had his own vision of Tolstoy's idea of resistance to evil through non-violence, by creating this image of Yeshua.

== The Spring Festival Ball at Spaso House ==
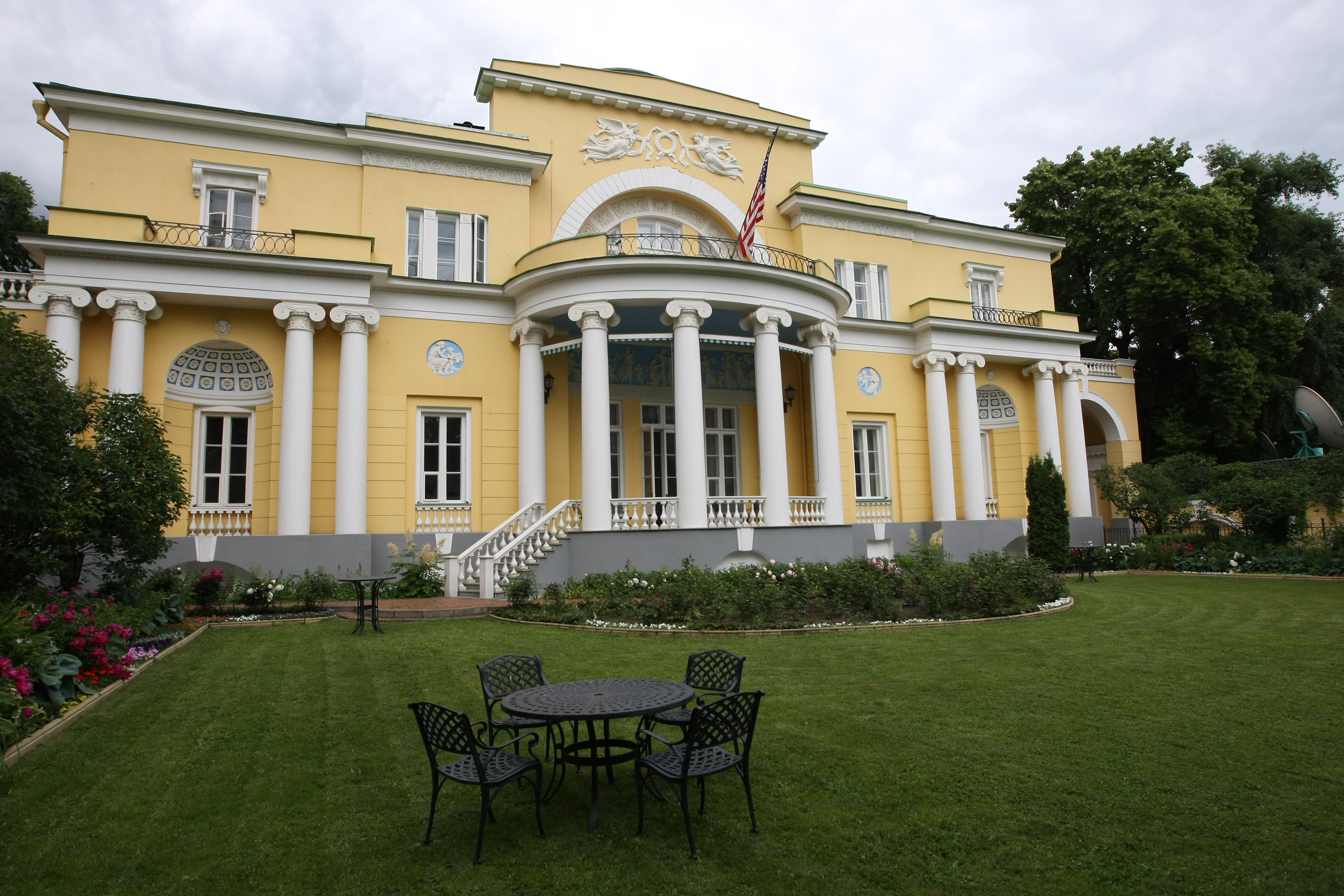
Spaso House

On 24 April 1935, Bulgakov was among the invited guests who attended the Spring Festival at Spaso House, the residence of the U.S. Ambassador to the Soviet Union, hosted by Ambassador William Bullitt. Critics believe Bulgakov drew from this extravagant event for his novel. In the middle of the Great Depression and Stalinist repression, Bullitt had instructed his staff to create an event that would surpass every other embassy party in Moscow's history. The decorations included a forest of ten young birch trees in the chandelier room; a dining room table covered with Finnish tulips; a lawn made of chicory grown on wet felt; a fishnet aviary filled with pheasants, parakeets, and one hundred zebra finches, on loan from the Moscow Zoo; and a menagerie including several mountain goats, a dozen white roosters, and a baby bear.

Although Joseph Stalin did not attend, the 400 elite guests at the festival included Foreign Minister Maxim Litvinov, Defense Minister Kliment Voroshilov, Communist Party heavyweights Nikolai Bukharin, Lazar Kaganovich, and Karl Radek, Soviet Marshals Aleksandr Yegorov, Mikhail Tukhachevsky, and Semyon Budyonny, and other high-ranking guests.

The festival lasted until the early hours of the morning. The bear became drunk on champagne given to him by Karl Radek. In the early morning hours, the zebra finches escaped from the aviary and perched below the ceilings around the house.

In his novel, Bulgakov featured the Spring Ball of the Full Moon, considered to be one of the most memorable episodes. On 29 October 2010, seventy-five years after the original ball, John Beyrle, U.S. Ambassador to the Russian Federation, hosted an Enchanted Ball at Spaso House, recreating the spirit of the original ball as a tribute to Ambassador Bullitt and Bulgakov.

== Major characters ==
=== Contemporary Russians ===
The Master
An author who wrote a novel about the meeting of Pontius Pilate and Yeshua Ha-Notsri (Jesus of Nazareth), which was rejected by the Soviet literary bureaucracy, ruining his career. He is "detained for questioning" for three months by the secret police because of a false report by an unscrupulous neighbor. Later, having been driven to the point of insanity by the critics (as the Master describes in Chapter 13), he is committed to a psychiatric clinic, where Bezdomny meets him. Little else is given about this character's past life beyond his work in a museum and a vague recollection of an unnamed wife, and his belief that his life began to have meaning when he met Margarita. Underscoring this point, the Master wears a hat with an "M" on it, made for and given to him by Margarita. The Master claims that he renounced his own name, further demonstrating his symbolic identity. The Master is an author surrogate for Bulgakov himself, as he represents Bulgakov's own struggles with censorship, criticism and stifled creativity in the Soviet Union. Further underscoring the Master's role as Bulgakov's shadow, The Master's title allegedly stems from a nickname that the United States Ambassador to the Soviet Union William Bullitt coined for Bulgakov.
Margarita
The Master's mistress. Trapped in a passionless marriage, she meets the Master while carrying yellow flowers which the Master describes as repulsive (yellow is a symbol of madness) and subsequently devotes herself to the Master. She is invited by Azazello to serve as the hostess of Satan's Grand Ball on Walpurgis Night, which she does while fully nude. Margarita agrees as she believes this step may save her love. Her character is believed to have been inspired by Bulgakov's last wife, Elena Bulgakova, whom he called "my Margarita". He may also have been influenced by Faust's Gretchen, whose full name is Margarete, as well as by Queen Marguerite de Valois. The latter is featured as the main character of the opera Les Huguenots by Giacomo Meyerbeer, which Bulgakov particularly enjoyed, and Alexandre Dumas's novel, La Reine Margot. In these accounts, the queen is portrayed as daring and passionate.
Mikhail Alexandrovich Berlioz
The Chairman of the literary bureaucracy MASSOLIT. He bears the last name (Берлиоз) of French composer Hector Berlioz, who wrote the opera The Damnation of Faust. Berlioz is a loyal supporter of the Stalinist regime and the ideology it purports. Following Soviet atheism, he insists to Ivan Nikolayevich Ponyryov that the Gospel Jesus was a mythical figure with no historical basis. Woland intervenes in this conversation, and later predicts that Berlioz will be decapitated by a young Soviet woman, which comes to pass when he slips on sunflower oil spilled by "Annushka" and is subsequently run over (and beheaded) by a tram.
Ivan Nikolayevich Ponyryov (Bezdomny)
A young, aspiring poet. His pen name, Bezdomny (Иван Бездомный), means "homeless". Initially a willing tool of the MASSOLIT apparatus, he is transformed by the events of the novel. After witnessing the unfolding of Woland's prediction—Berlioz's death—he embarks on a wild chase around Moscow in search of Woland and his entourage. However, Ivan leads himself to a communal apartment and later to the Moskva River, where he engages in a symbolic self-baptism. Unable to rationalize the events he has witnessed, his psychological distress mounts and his behavior becomes increasingly erratic. His seemingly irrational claims about Woland lead him to be taken to Dr Stravinsky's psychiatric clinic, where he is diagnosed with schizophrenia and meets the Master. He eventually decides to stop writing poetry and comes to terms with the tragedy. Before settling on Bezdomny, Bulgakov tried many other names in earlier versions of the novel, including Bezrodny ("the lonely"), Besprizorny ("the stray kid"), Bezbrezhny ("the boundless") and many others. Proletarian writers often used similar pseudonyms; notable examples are Maxim Gorky ("the bitter") and Demyan Bedny ("the poor").
Stephan Bogdanovich Likhodeyev
The Director of the Variety Theatre and Berlioz's roommate, often called by the diminutive name "Styopa (Stepa)". His surname is derived from the Russian word for "malfeasant". For his wicked deeds (denouncing at least five innocent people as spies so that he and Berlioz could grab their multi-bedroom apartment), he is magically teleported to Yalta, thereby freeing up the stolen apartment for Woland and his retinue.
Grigory Danilovich Rimsky
The Treasurer of the Variety Theatre. Rimsky is the only character to escape from an attack by Woland's entourage. Despite trying to find logical explanations for Styopa's disappearance and other odd phenomena, he realizes that Varenukha is lying to him when he outlines a seemingly reasonable explanation for where Styopa had gone, and correctly identifies that Varenukha has no shadow, which is impossible under normal circumstances. On the night of Woland's performance, Rimsky is ambushed by Varenukha (who has been turned into a vampire by Woland's gang) and Hella. He barely escapes the encounter and flees to the train station to get out of the city for Leningrad.
Ivan Savelyevich Varenukha
The administrator of the Variety Theatre, whose surname refers to a traditional Ukrainian spiced vodka resembling mulled wine. He is turned into a vampire when Hella ambushes him in his attempt to report the odd circumstances surrounding Styopa's disappearance to the authorities. He is forgiven by the end of Walpurgis Night, restoring his humanity.
Alexander Riukhin
A poet who brings Ivan to Dr Stravinsky's psychiatric clinic. He is tormented by Ivan's insults of the integrity of his poetry and acknowledges that his poetry is bad because he does not believe in anything he writes. As the night ends, he mourns the loss of the night of fun and feasting he could have had at Griboedov's.
Natasha (Natalia Prokofyevna)
Margarita's young maid, later turned into a witch after using Azazello's magic cream on herself.
Nikolai Ivanovich
Margarita's downstairs neighbor, on whose head Natasha rubs Azazello's magic cream, turning him into a hog. Natasha rides Nikolai (as a hog) to Woland's Ball. He receives a certificate from Woland that confirms his activity of attending the ball and turning into a hog on the night of the ball.
Nikanor Ivanovich Bosoy
The Chairman of the House Committee at 302A Sadovaya Street (the former residence of Berlioz). Unlike regular Moscow citizens, who generally live in communal apartments, Bosoy shares an entire apartment with only his wife. After Bosoy accepts a bribe from Koroviev for allowing Woland to stay in the Berlioz's apartment, Woland swiftly punishes his crookedness. The bribe from Koroviev magically turns into foreign money, and Bosoy is arrested by the secret police. Bosoy's character is loosely based on one of Bulgakov's own landlords, Nikolay Zotkiovitch Raev, who similarly abused his power.
Maximilian Andreevich Poplavsky
An uncle of Mikhail Alexandrovich Berlioz. He is a highly educated man who comes to Moscow from Kyiv in an attempt to claim Berlioz's Moscow apartment. When he arrives, he is mocked by Koroviev for trying to take advantage of Berlioz's death while not feeling any genuine grief for the deceased. Ultimately, he is sent home by Woland's retinue.
Andrei Fokich Sokov
The barman at the Variety Theater; a short, bald, and outwardly-humble character. In an apartment commandeered by Woland and his retinue, Sokov is interrogated and ultimately it is revealed that, behind his humble and well-behaved veil, the barman has amassed an enormous fortune. He is then told by Woland that he will die of liver cancer in nine months' time, and finds himself in Professor Kuzmin's office desperately begging to be cured.
Alexander Nikolayevich Stravinsky
The head of the clinic in which the Master, Bezdomny and other characters reside, Dr Stravinsky plays an important role in the novel. When Ivan arrives in the clinic after witnessing Berlioz's decapitation, Stravinsky diagnoses him with schizophrenia and alcoholism, and insists he remains in the clinic because he believes that Ivan's story is a sign of mental illness. Ivan insists upon leaving the clinic, but Stravinsky manipulates him in discussion and convinces him that he must remain there.
George Bengalsky
The master of ceremonies at the Variety Theater. Bengalsky, after commenting on black magic at Woland's performance, is beheaded by Woland's retinue. His head is returned after the audience forgives him. Later, it is implied that he is in Stravinsky's clinic. Bengalsky is meant to represent the Soviet public and their refusal to believe in magic and religion; he makes sure to describe the "rational" explanations behind all of Woland's tricks and becomes irritated when Woland refuses to admit that there are explanations for his magic. Woland becomes angry with Bengalsky because Woland sees him as a symbol of Soviet brainwashing; the citizens believe only what they are told and cannot think for themselves, even when the simple truth is right in front of them.
Vassily Stepanovich Lastochkin
The bookkeeper at the Variety Theater. Described by Bulgakov as "precise and efficient", Lastochkin is not present for Woland's séance and is left to make sense of the event's aftermath for the police as the theater's most senior remaining officer. After being questioned by the police, Lastochkin heads to the Commission on Spectacles and Entertainment of the Lighter Type to explain the prior day's events, but is greeted by pandemonium as the Commission's chairman has been turned into a talking suit. Unable to file his report there, Lastochkin continues on his way to the Commission's affiliate, where he encounters further havoc as the staff have been forced to sing uncontrollably. His final stop of the day takes him to the bank to deposit the Variety's earnings from Woland's performance. There, upon discovering that the fees have turned into thousands in various foreign currencies, Lastochkin is promptly and unceremoniously arrested.

=== Woland and his entourage ===
Woland
Woland (Воланд, also spelled as Voland) is Satan in the disguise of a "foreign professor" who is "in Moscow to present a performance of 'black magic' and then expose its machinations". Woland instead exposes the greed and bourgeois behaviour of the spectators themselves. Woland is described as having platinum crowns on the left side of his teeth and gold on the right, with his right eye black and his left eye green. The contrasts in his appearance reflect the complexity of his character and moral positioning within the novel. Woland is also mentioned in Faust when Mephistopheles announces to the witches to beware because "Squire Voland is here". Along with that, it is highly implied throughout the novel that he is present as the devil in the form of a sparrow (such as in the Pilate narrative). In the previous versions of The Master and Margarita, Woland's name changed multiple times. In the second version from 1929, his name was Dr Theodor Voland. The name was written down and given to Ivan Bezdomniy in Greek letters as opposed to the Cyrillic letters. In a subsequent version of the novel, Woland's name changed to господин [gospodin] or seigneur Azazello Woland. The demon we now know as Azazello was called Fiello. Only in 1934, the definitive names of Woland and Azazello got their final meaning.

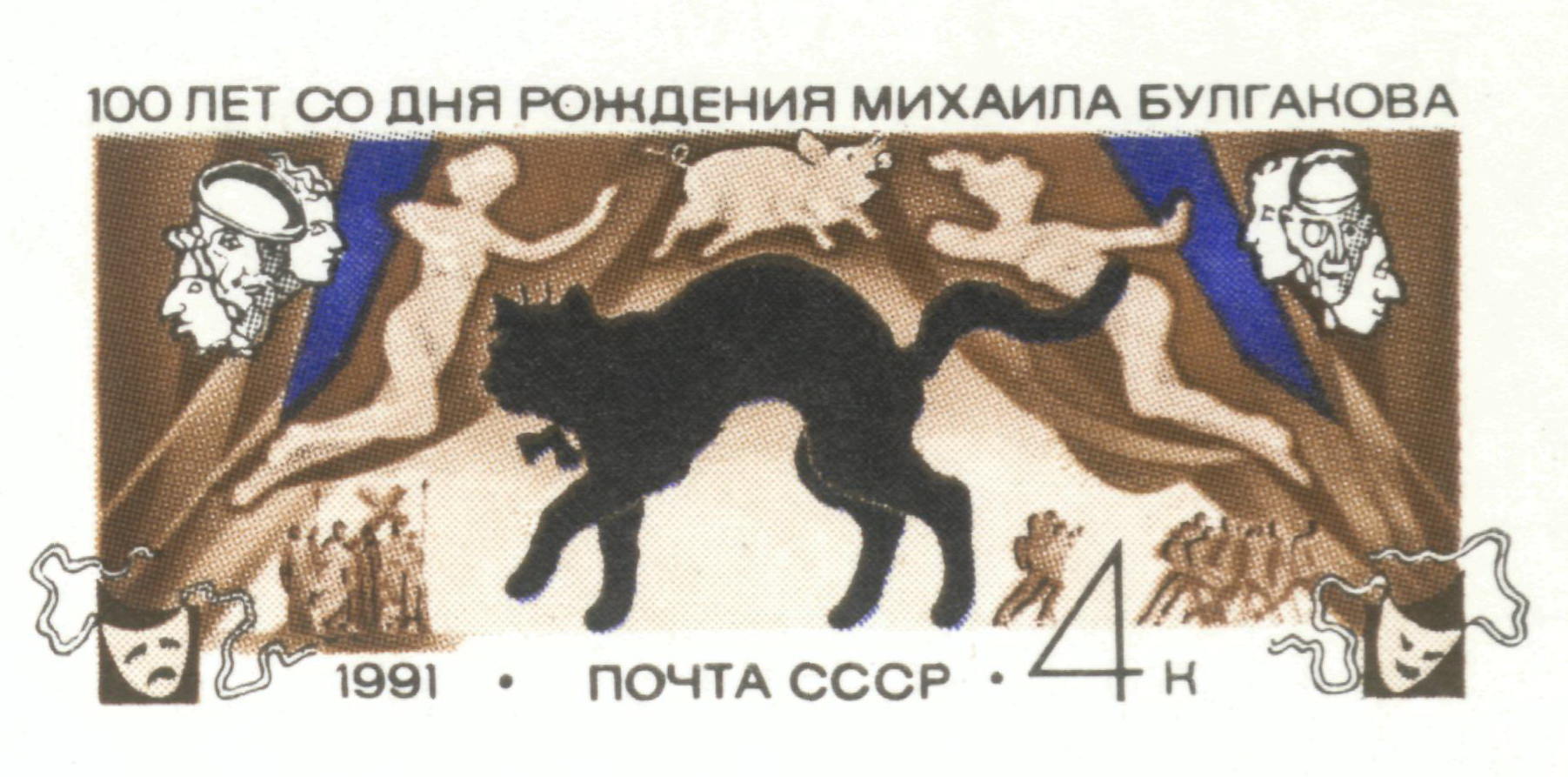
Behemoth on Russian stamp

Behemoth
An enormous demonic black werecat (said to be as big as a hog) who speaks, walks on two legs, and can transform into human shape for brief periods of time. He has a penchant for chess, vodka, pistols, and obnoxious sarcasm. He is evidently the least-respected member of Woland's team—Margarita boldly takes to slapping Behemoth on the head after one of his many ill-timed jokes, without fear of retaliation. In the last chapters, it appears that Behemoth is a demon pageboy, the best jester in the world. His name (Бегемот) refers to both the Biblical monster and the Russian word for hippopotamus. Behemoth is a well-known character from The Master and Margarita, and he is frequently depicted. However, in the original version of the novel from 1928 to 1929, which was titled The Black Magician, there was a sentence mentioning the presence of a second cat on the curtain rod when the theatre's buffet master visits Woland. Bulgakov later abandoned the idea of having two cats in the story.
Korovyev
Also known as Fagotto (Фагот, meaning "bassoon" in Russian and other languages), he is described as an "ex-choirmaster", perhaps implying that he was once a member of an angelic choir. Korovyev's name is also based on the Russian word for "cow" (Корова), a reference to Charles Gounod's Faust, where Mephistopheles praises a "Calf of Gold". At the same time, it echoes the Hebrew word karov (קרוב), meaning "close", hinting at his special proximity to Woland as his right-hand man. Being the only member of Woland and his entourage with a Russian name, he is Woland's assistant and translator, and is capable of creating any illusion. He is described as a thin and extremely lengthy man dressed in all-plaid shabby clothes paired with a jockey's cap and a broken pince-nez. A mustache and a piercing, rattling voice, as well as mocking and clownish disposition are also mentioned. Unlike Behemoth and Azazello, he does not use violence at any point. Like Behemoth, his true form is revealed at the end: a never-smiling dark knight. In penance for a poorly-made joke "about Light and Dark" he was forced to assume the role of a jester; he paid off his debt by serving Satan on his Moscow journey. Vasily Ivanovich Shverubovich (1875–1948), an actor at the Moscow Art Theatre (MkhAT) who performed under the name Vasily Ivanovich Katshalov, is a possible inspiration for Koroviev. Katshalov hailed from Vilnius, Lithuania, and had a distinctive accent when he sang. He was tall and thin, standing at 1.85 meters, and wore pince-nez glasses due to his nearsightedness. Kachalov possessed an irresistible charm on stage with his eloquently speaking, pleasant voice, and a great sense of humor. Another MkhAT actor and director, Grigory Grigoryevich Konsky (1911–1972), also shared some characteristics with Bulgakov's portrayal of Koroviev. He was a close friend of the Bulgakov family and known as a "master of irony and humor".
Azazello
Azazello (Азазелло) is a menacing, fanged, and wall-eyed member of Woland's retinue who acts as a messenger and assassin. His name may be a reference to Azazel, the fallen angel who taught people to make weapons and jewelry, and taught women the "sinful art" of painting their faces (mentioned in the pseudepigraphal Book of Enoch 8:1–3). He gives a magical cream to Margarita. He transforms into his real shape in the end: a pale-faced demon with black, empty eyes. Bulgakov appends an Italian suffix to the Hebrew name עֲזָאזֵל [Azazel]. The name Azazel is frequently associated with Satan in various religious texts and beliefs. In Bulgakov's archives, a book called Azazel and Dionysus was discovered, published in 1924 and authored by Nikolai Evreinov (1879–1953), who was a director, dramatist, historian, philosopher, and psychologist.
Hella
Hella (Гелла) is a beautiful, redheaded succubus. Her name may be a reference to the Brockhaus and Efron Encyclopedic Dictionary (the Soviet equivalent of the Encyclopedia Britannica), underneath the section on "witchcraft", where "Hella" was one of the names of premature girls who became vampires after death on the island of Lesbos. She serves as maid to Woland and his retinue. She is described as being "perfect, were it not for a purple scar on her neck", suggesting that she has been executed by hanging. In the earlier version of the book, she was named Marta. According to Valery Konstantinovich Mershavka, a Russian psychologist and translator, Hella was inspired by Sophia Perovskaya. Perovskaya was a member of the socialist revolutionary organization named The Will of the People and participated in three attempts to assassinate Tsar Alexander II, the last of which was successful, leading to her execution by hanging.

=== Characters from Judaea subplot ===
Pontius Pilate
The Roman Procurator of Judaea (a governor of a small province). The historical Pontius Pilate was the Prefect of Judaea, not the procurator. This fact was not widely known until after Bulgakov's death. In the novel, Pontius Pilate is a central character in the subplot set in ancient Jerusalem. Pilate suffers terribly from migraines, has suicidal thoughts, and loves only his dog, Banga. He is tasked with determining Yeshua Ha-Notsri's guilt and ultimately is responsible for his death sentence. Nevertheless, after this sentencing, Pilate experiences feelings of guilt and doubt: "it seemed vaguely to the procurator that there was something he had not finished saying to the condemned man, and perhaps something he had not finished hearing." Thus, overall, Bulgakov's portrayal of Pontius Pilate offers a nuanced exploration of human nature and the consequences of moral choices.
Yeshua Ha-Notsri
Jesus the Nazarene (Иешуа га-Ноцри), a wanderer or "mad philosopher", as Pilate calls him. His name in Hebrew is said to mean either "Jesus who belongs to the Nazarene sect" or "Jesus who is from a place called Nazareth", though some commentators dispute the latter interpretation. In the Master's version, Yeshua describes himself as an orphan (he says "some say that my father was a Syrian"), calls everybody (even a torturer) "kind man", denies doing miracles, and has one full-time "Apostle", not 12, among other departures from the Gospels and mainstream Christian tradition. In the Master's novel there is not a hint of the cleansing of the Temple or cursing the fig tree. The atheist regime of the novel still considers this Jesus to be offensive.
Aphranius
(or Afranius). Head of the Roman Secret Service in Judaea. That character was later an inspiration for the 1995 novel The Gospel of Afranius by Kirill Eskov.
Niza
Aphranius's henchwoman, who entices Judas to his death.
Levi Matvei
Levite, former tax collector, follower of Yeshua. Levi attempts to save Yeshua with a bread knife, and after failing, he is the only spectator, except for the executioners, of Yeshua's death and cuts Yeshua's body down from the cross. Levi is introduced as a semi-fictionalized character in the Master's novel, but toward the end of The Master and Margarita, the "historical" Matthew of the Gospel appears in Moscow to deliver a message from Yeshua to Woland.
Caiaphas
Politically savvy High Priest of Judaea. Caiaphas supports the execution of Yeshua in order to "protect" the status quo ante religion, and his own status as the Chief of the Sanhedrin, from the influence of Yeshua's preachings and followers. He is considerably more aggressive towards Pilate than most accounts, and seems unconcerned by the other man's senior status.
Mark the Ratslayer
The centurion in Yershalaim. Tall, strong, and physically intimidating, the Ratslayer is an agent of the state and a symbol of its brutality. Mark the Ratslayer also illustrates Yeshua's argument about humanity's inherent goodness. Despite his cruelty, Yeshua claims that the Ratslayer is not a bad person; he has simply "become cruel and hard" after being disfigured by others and subjected to violence himself.
Banga
Pilate's loyal dog. He provides Pilate with comfort and Pilate feels comfortable complaining to him about his headaches. Banga is the only "being" Pilate is attached to, and therefore fosters a humanization of the procurator, characterizing him as profoundly lonely.
Judas Iscariot
A spy/informant hired by Caiaphas to assist the authorities in finding and arresting Yeshua. In contrast to the Gospels' version, in which Judas is a long-time member of Jesus's "inner circle" of Apostles, Bulgakov's Judas (of Karioth) meets Yeshua for the first time less than 48 hours before betraying him. He is paid off by Caiaphas, but is later assassinated on Pilate's orders for his role in Yeshua's death.

== Themes and imagery ==
The novel deals with the interplay of good and evil, innocence and guilt, courage and cowardice, exploring such issues as the responsibility towards truth when authority would deny it, and freedom of the spirit in an unfree world. Love and sensuality are also dominant themes in the novel.

=== Love ===
Margarita's devotional love for the Master leads her to leave her husband, but she emerges victorious. Her spiritual union with the Master is also a sexual one. The novel is a riot of sensual impressions, but the emptiness of sensual gratification without love is emphasized in the satirical passages. Rejecting sensuality for the sake of empty respectability is pilloried in the figure of Nikolai Ivanovich, who becomes Natasha's hog-broomstick. Love is not only relevant in the Master's relationship with Margarita, but also his relationship with writing as a whole. After he wins the lottery and leaves his job at the museum, he decides to purchase a flat where he can hide out and write. It is here that he begins his novel on Pilate. This novel takes him through many ups and downs, culminating in his capture and internment in the mental hospital, but only after he destroys his novel.

=== Religion ===
The interplay of fire, water, destruction, and other natural forces provides a constant accompaniment to the events of the novel, as do light and darkness, noise and silence, sun and moon, storms and tranquility, and other powerful polarities. There is a complex relationship between Jerusalem and Moscow throughout the novel, sometimes polyphony, sometimes counterpoint. Though the two parts of the novel are set centuries apart, the action in both unfolds in parallel over the course of five days (Wednesday to Sunday). The chapters consisting of the Jerusalem story (chapters 2, 16, 25, and 26) are woven into the lives of the Moscow characters, and there are several characters that even bridge the two narratives. Woland, who visits Berlioz and Bezdomny in Moscow, claims to have been present during Yeshua's trial in Jerusalem. And Levi Matvei, Yeshua's disciple, appears in Moscow at the end of the novel. The overlap between the two plot lines is further complicated by the fact that the Jerusalem story is presented as the novel written by the master, raising questions of authorship and muddling the distinction between fiction and reality.

=== Critique of Soviet Regime ===
Bulgakov employs Aesopian language in order to criticize the hypocrisy of Soviet society. He makes a commentary on the flaws of Soviet society by referencing distinct issues such as the housing crisis, corruption and the secret police. His methodology of introducing characters that benefit from the new regime, and then punishing them for their sins through Woland displays his condemnation of the conditions in the 1930s Soviet Union. An issue that is particularly emphasized in the novel is censorship, literary repression and suppression of creativity. Bulgakov's portrayal of Massolit writers and their luxurious, extravagant lifestyles is a mockery of their real-life counterparts such as Vladimir Mayakovsky. The novel is a satirical critique of the Soviet regime that condemns the decline of humanity's virtues, through its portrayal of secondary characters. Bulgakov implores a tone of satirical dark comedy when describing neighbors' random "disappearances", Stepan's mysterious teleportation to Yalta, and the magical memory erasure that occurs after state-sanctioned interrogations. Bulgakov obscures the tragedy of violence by adding a fantastical element to these overtly dark forms of torture carried out by the Soviet State. This layer of fantasy in turn provided protection for himself, as he was not able to state the atrocities of the government without risking his own safety.

=== Faust ===
The novel is deeply influenced by Goethe's Faust, and its themes of cowardice, trust, intellectual curiosity, and redemption are prominent. It can be read on many different levels, as slapstick, philosophical allegory, and socio-political satire critical of not just the Soviet system but also the superficiality and vanity of modern life in general. Jazz is presented with an ambivalent fascination and revulsion. But the novel is full of modern elements, such as the model asylum, radio, street and shopping lights, cars, lorries, trams, and air travel. There is little evident nostalgia for any "good old days"—the only figures who mention Tsarist Russia are Satan and the Narrator, who directly addresses characters in the novel and the reader multiple times. It also has strong elements of what in the later 20th century was called magic realism.

== Allusions and references to other works ==
The novel is influenced by the Faust legend, particularly the first part of the Goethe interpretation, The Devil's Pact, which goes back to the 4th century; Christopher Marlowe's Dr Faustus (where in the last act the hero cannot burn his manuscript or receive forgiveness from a loving God); and the libretto of the opera whose music was composed by Charles Gounod. Also of influence is Louis Hector Berlioz who wrote the opera La damnation de Faust. In this opera there are four characters: Faust (tenor), the devil Méphistophélès (baritone), Marguerite (mezzo-soprano) and Brander (bass). And also, the Symphonie fantastique where the hero dreams of his own decapitation and attending a witches' sabbath. In addition, allusions are made to the work of Igor Stravinsky numerous times: prominent character and clinic head Dr Stravinsky shares the composer's name, and references to specific compositions are made in the novel.

Satirical poetics of Nikolai Gogol and Mikhail Saltykov-Shchedrin are seen as an influence, as is the case in other Bulgakov novels. Bulgakov perceived and embodied the principles of Gogol's and Saltykov-Shchedrin's world perception through the comic mixing of absurd, ghostly and real. Technical progress and the rapid development of mechanized production in the 20th century, combined with the satirical motive of primitivism, characteristic of Russian literature, left an imprint on the nature of Bulgakov's grotesque.

The dialogue between Pontius Pilate and Yeshua Ha-Notsri is strongly influenced by Fyodor Dostoyevsky's parable "The Grand Inquisitor" from The Brothers Karamazov. The "luckless visitors chapter" refers to Tolstoy's Anna Karenina: "everything became jumbled in the Oblonsky household". The theme of the Devil exposing society as an apartment block, as it could be seen if the entire façade would be removed, has some precedents in El diablo cojuelo (1641, The Limping Devil) by the Spaniard Luís Vélez de Guevara. (This was adapted to 18th-century France by Alain-René Lesage's 1707 Le Diable boiteux.)

== English translations ==
The novel has been translated several times into English:

- Mirra Ginsburg's 1967 version for Grove Press
- Michael Glenny's November 1967 version for Harper and Row and Harvill Press
- Diana Lewis Burgin and Katherine Tiernan O'Connor's 1993 version for Ardis Publishing
- Richard Pevear and Larissa Volokhonsky's 1997 version for Penguin Books
- Michael Karpelson's 2006 version for Lulu Press and Wordsworth
- Hugh Aplin's 2008 version for Oneworld Publications
- John Dougherty's 2017 version for Russian Tumble
- Elena Yushenko's 2021 version for OmniScriptum
- Sergei Khramtsov-Templar's 2000 version (non-published, catalogued with the Library of Congress)

The early translation by Glenny runs more smoothly than that of the modern translations; some Russian-speaking readers consider it to be the only one creating the desired effect, though it may take liberties with the text. The modern translators pay for their attempted closeness by losing idiomatic flow. Literary writer Kevin Moss considers the early translations by Ginsburg and Glenny to be hurried, and lacking much critical depth. As an example, he claims that the more idiomatic translations miss Bulgakov's "crucial" reference to the devil in Berlioz's thoughts (original: "Пожалуй, пора бросить все к черту и в Кисловодск…"):

- "I ought to drop everything and run down to Kislovodsk." (Ginsburg)
- "I think it's time to chuck everything up and go and take the waters at Kislovodsk." (Glenny)
- "It's time to throw everything to the devil and go off to Kislovodsk." (Burgin and Tiernan O'Connor)
- "It's time to send it all to the devil and go to Kislovodsk." (Pevear and Volokhonsky)
- "To hell with everything, it's time to take that Kislovodsk vacation." (Karpelson)
- "It's time to let everything go to the devil and be off to Kislovodsk." (Aplin)
- "It's time to throw it all to the devil and go to Kislovodsk." (John Dougherty)

Several literary critics hailed the Burgin/Tiernan O'Connor translation as the most accurate and complete English translation, particularly when read in tandem with the matching annotations by Bulgakov's biographer, Ellendea Proffer. However, these judgements predate translations by Pevear and Volokhonsky, Karpelson, Aplin, and Dougherty. The Karpelson translation, even when republished in the UK by Wordsworth, has not been Anglicised, and retains North American spellings and idioms.

== Cultural influence ==
The book was listed in Le Monde's 100 Books of the Century. Also, when asked by Tyler Cowen, "What's your favorite novel?" the technologist Peter Thiel answered: "If you want something a little more intellectual, it's probably the Bulgakov novel The Master and Margarita where the devil shows up in Stalinist Russia, and succeeds, and gives everybody what they want, and everything goes haywire. It's hard, because no one believes he's real."

=== Manuscripts don't burn ===
A memorable and much-quoted line in The Master and Margarita is "manuscripts don't burn" (рукописи не горят). The Master is a writer who is plagued both by his own mental problems and the harsh political criticism faced by most Soviet writers in 1930s Moscow in the Stalinist Soviet Union. He burns his treasured manuscript in an effort to cleanse his mind from the troubles the work has brought him. When they finally meet, Woland asks to see the Master's novel; the Master apologizes for not being able to do so, as he had burnt it. Woland replies, "You can't have done. Manuscripts don't burn." There is a deeply autobiographical element reflected in this passage. Bulgakov burned an early copy of The Master and Margarita for much the same reasons as he expresses in the novel. Also this may refer to Christopher Marlowe's Dr. Faustus where the hero, deviating from previous tales of 'The Devil's Pact', is unable to burn his books or repent to a merciful God.

=== Bulgakov museums in Moscow ===
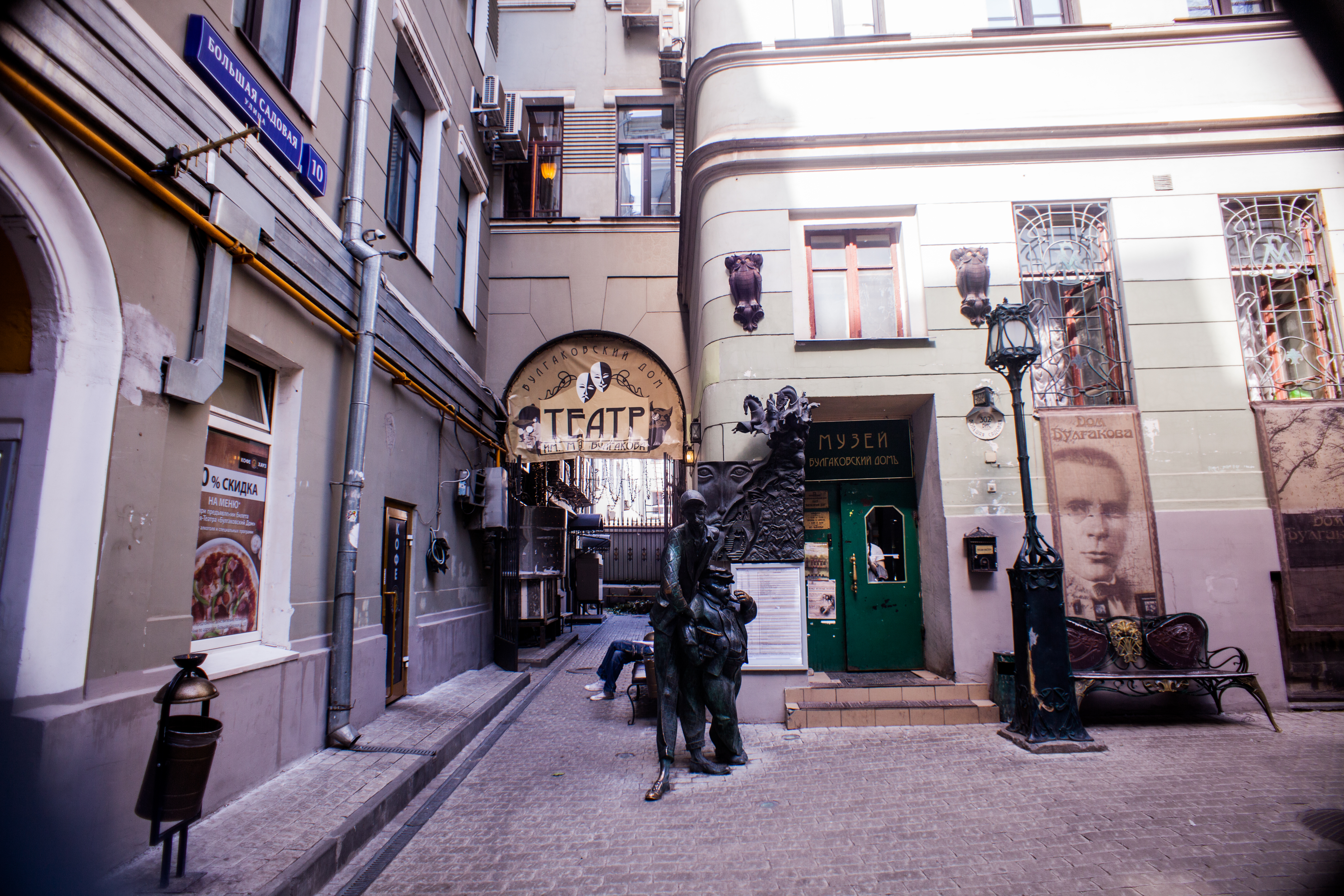
Bulgakov House

In Moscow, two museums honor the memory of Mikhail Bulgakov and The Master and Margarita. Both are located in Bulgakov's former apartment building on Bolshaya Sadovaya Street, No. 10. Since the late 1980s and the fall of the Soviet Union, the building has become a gathering spot for Bulgakov fans, as well as Moscow-based Satanist groups. Over the years they have filled the walls with graffiti. The best drawings were usually kept as the walls were repainted, so that several layers of different colored paints could be seen around them. In 2003, all of the numerous paintings, quips, and drawings were completely whitewashed.

The two museums are rivals: the official Museum M.A. Bulgakov, although established second, identifies as "the first and only Memorial Museum of Mikhail Bulgakov in Moscow".

- Bulgakov House

The Bulgakov House (Музей – театр "Булгаковский Дом") is situated on the ground floor of the building. This museum was established as a private initiative on 15 May 2004. It contains personal belongings, photos, and several exhibitions related to Bulgakov's life and his different works. Various poetic and literary events are often held. The museum organises tours of Bulgakov's Moscow, some of which have re-enactors playing characters of The Master and Margarita. The Bulgakov House also operates the Theatre M.A. Bulgakov and the Café 302-bis.

- Museum M.A. Bulgakov

In apartment number 50 on the fourth floor is the Museum M.A. Bulgakov (Музей М А. Булгаков). This facility is a government initiative, founded on 26 March 2007. It contains personal belongings, photos, and several exhibitions related to Bulgakov's life and his different works. Various poetic and literary events are often held here.

=== Allusions and references ===
Various authors and musicians have credited The Master and Margarita as inspiration for certain works.

- Mick Jagger of The Rolling Stones was inspired by the novel in writing the song "Sympathy for the Devil". Will Self's foreword to the Vintage edition of the Michael Glenny translation of the novel suggests the same, and Jagger's then girlfriend Marianne Faithfull confirmed it in an interview with Sylvie Simmons from the magazine Mojo in 2005. Jagger says so himself in the Stones documentary Crossfire Hurricane.
- Indian author Salman Rushdie cited the novel as one of two major influences on his 1988 book, The Satanic Verses, which precipitated a fatwa to kill him. "'The Master and Margarita' and its author were persecuted by Soviet totalitarianism," Rushdie wrote in Newsweek in 1990. "It is extraordinary to find my novel's life echoing that of one of its greatest models."
- SORAYA released a song called 'the master and margarita' co-written with Adrian Grenier. The song was inspired by the novel, SORAYA's favorite book, but imagined the story taking place in contemporary Austin Texas. It was distributed by Empire.
- The grunge band Pearl Jam were influenced by the novel's confrontation between Jesus and Pontius Pilate in their song, "Pilate", on their 1998 album Yield.
- The Canadian band The Tea Party has a song named "The Master and Margarita".
- Surrealist artist H. R. Giger named a 1976 painting after the novel. The band Danzig featured this painting on the cover of their 1992 album Danzig III: How the Gods Kill.
- The title song on Patti Smith's album Banga refers to Pontius Pilate and his dog Banga as portrayed in The Master and Margarita.
- Master Margherita - musical band from Switzerland.
- Several songs written by the Chicago punk band The Lawrence Arms, for example "Chapter 13: The Hero Appears" from the 2003 album The Greatest Story Ever Told.
- Russian writers Arkady and Boris Strugatsky were heavily influenced by this novel when writing several of their books. Аmong them are such works as Snail on the Slope, Lame Fate, Burdened with Evil and others.
- The Master and Margarita is cited as inspiration for Devil on the Cross, a Gikuyu language novel written by Kenyan novelist and Nobel Prize nominee Ngũgĩ wa Thiong'o. Thiong'o wrote the original manuscript as a political prisoner between 1977 and 1978 in Kamiti Maximum Security Prison, where he was detained for a year without trial due to staging his play Ngaahika Ndeenda, a work criticizing corruption and hypocrisy amongst the new political elite of Kenya. One of the clear parallels that emerge in Devil on the Cross is a celebration known as the "Devil's Feast", reminiscent of "Satan's Great Ball" in Bulgakov's Master and Margarita. The Devil's Feast in Thiong'o's novel is a festival organized by the devil and neocolonialist powers celebrating seven of the most wicked and corrupt amongst the Kenyan bourgeoisie and awarding them with powerful positions.
- Poppy Z. Brite's short story The Devil You Know continues The Master and Margarita with the Devil (masquerading as William C. Bubb) and his "great black cat" (now shaven, and mistaken for a negro) traveling to New Orleans in 1985.

== Adaptations ==
=== Movies and serials ===
- 1972: The joint Italian-Yugoslavian production of Aleksandar Petrović's The Master and Margaret (Italian: Il Maestro e Margherita, Serbo-Croatian: Majstor i Margarita) was released. Based loosely on the book, in the movie the Master is named Nikolaj Afanasijevic Maksudov, while in the original book the Master is anonymous.
- 1988: The Polish director Maciej Wojtyszko produced The Master and Margarita (Mistrz i Małgorzata), a TV miniseries of four episodes.
- 1989: the Russian theatre director Aleksandr Dzekun adapted his theatre play Master i Margarita for television. As suggested by the subtitle, "Chapters from the novel": the film covers part of the novel; 21 chapters were adapted in a miniseries.
- 2005: Russian director Vladimir Bortko, noted for his TV adaptations of Bulgakov's Heart of a Dog and Dostoyevsky's The Idiot, made a The Master and Margarita TV series of ten episodes. It stars Aleksandr Galibin as The Master, Anna Kovalchuk as Margarita, Oleg Basilashvili as Woland, Aleksandr Abdulov as Korovyev-Fagotto, Vladislav Galkin as Bezdomny, Kirill Lavrov as Pontius Pilate, Valentin Gaft as Caiaphas, and Sergey Bezrukov as Yeshua.
- 2024: Michael Lockshin co-wrote and directed Russian film The Master and Margarita, this version of the story weaved together earlier drafts of the manuscript and Bulgakov's own experience with the regime. German actor August Diehl is Woland, Yevgeny Tsyganov is the Master, and Yuliya Snigir is Margarita. The script was shot in 2021 in Russia and Croatia. Distribution efforts were put on hold in 2022 because of distributor Universal Pictures pulling out of Russia after the Russia's invasion of Ukraine, and the director's stance about the war. The release date was pushed back from 2023 to January 25, 2024. The world premiere outside of the Russia was on March 6, 2024, at Yale University.

=== Short or unreleased films ===
- In 1968, during her training at the Gerasimov Institute of Cinematography (VGIK), Svetlana Sergeevna Druzhinina would become the very first director to film a scene from the novel. The film had 15-minutes and was shown only once, and the two copies were lost.
- 1970: The Finnish director Seppo Wallin made the movie Pilatus for the series Teatterituokio (Theatre Sessions) from the Finnish public broadcasting company, based on the biblical part of the book.
- 1971: the Polish director Andrzej Wajda made the movie Pilate and Others for the West German public service TV channel ZDF, based on the biblical part of the book ('The Master's manuscript').
- 1989: Director Roman Polanski was approached by Warner Bros. to adapt and direct Bulgakov's novel. The project was subsequently dropped by Warner Bros. due to budgetary concerns and the studio's belief that the subject matter was no longer relevant due to the fall of the Berlin Wall. Polanski has described his script as the best he has ever adapted.
- 1992: In the adaptation called Incident in Judaea by Paul Bryers, only the Yeshua story is told. The film includes a prologue which mentions Bulgakov and the other storylines. The cast includes John Woodvine, Mark Rylance, Lee Montague and Jim Carter. The film was distributed by Brook Productions and Channel 4.
- 1993 or 1994: A Russian movie adaptation of the novel was made by Yuri Kara. Although the cast included big names and talented actors (Anastasiya Vertinskaya as Margarita, Mikhail Ulyanov as Pilate, Nikolai Burlyayev as Yeshua, Valentin Gaft as Woland, Aleksandr Filippenko as Korovyev-Fagotto) and its score was by the noted Russian composer Alfred Schnittke, the movie was not released on any media. The grandson of Bulgakov's third wife Elena Sergeevna Shilovskaya claimed, as a self-assigned heir, the rights on Bulgakov's literary inheritance and refused the release. Since 2006, copies of the movie have existed on DVD. Some excerpts can be viewed on the Master and Margarita website. The movie was finally released in cinemas on April 4, 2011.
- 1996: The Russian director Sergey Desnitsky and his wife, the actress Vera Desnitskaya, made the film Master i Margarita. Disappointed by the responses of the Russian media, they decided not to release the film for distribution.
- 2002: the French animators Clément Charmet and Elisabeth Klimoff made a flash animation of the first and third chapter of The Master and Margarita based on Jean-François Desserre's graphic novel.
- 2003: The Iranian director, Kamal Tabrizi, made the movie Sometimes Look at the Sky, loosely based on The Master and Margarita.
- 2005: The Hungarian director Ibolya Fekete made a short film of 26 minutes, entitled A Mester és Margarita. This film, with such noted Russian and Hungarian actors as Sergey Grekov, Grigory Lifanov, and Regina Myannik, was broadcast by MTV Premier on 5 October 2005.
- 2008: The Italian director Giovanni Brancale made the film Il Maestro e Margherita, set in contemporary Florence.
- 2010: Russian-Israeli- director Terentij Oslyabya made an animation film The Master and Margarita, Chapter 1. His movie literally illustrates the novel. A mobile version was available, with efforts to create a full-length animated feature facing funding challenges.
- 2012: The Russian animation filmmaker Rinat Timerkaev started working on a full-length animated film Master i Margarita. On his blog, Timerkaev informed followers in 2015 that he would not continue working on it due to expenses. He had already released a trailer, which can be seen on YouTube.
- 2013: The Finnish animation filmmaker Katariina Lillqvist released a pilot film of five minutes for a planned puppet animation version of The Master and Margarita. The project was halted in 2014 and had not been resumed as of 2024.
- 2017: The French director Charlotte Waligòra made the film Le maître et Marguerite in which she played the role of Margarita herself. The other characters are interpreted by Michel Baibabaeff (Woland), Vadim Essaïan (Behemoth), Hatem Taïeb (Jesus) and Giovanni Marino Luna (The Master).
- 2017: The Russian animation filmmaker Alexander Golberg Jero started working on a full-length animated film Master i Margarita. Media entrepreneur and co-producer Matthew Helderman, CEO of BondIt Media Capital, is responsible for collecting the necessary funds.

Many students of art schools found inspiration in The Master and Margarita to make short animated movies. A full list is available on the Master & Margarita website.

=== Soundtracks ===
Ennio Morricone, Alfred Schnittke and Igor Kornelyuk have composed soundtracks for films of The Master and Margarita.

=== Radio ===
- A four-part classic serial adapted by Brian Wright was broadcast by BBC World Service Drama in 1992 starring Michael Maloney, Daniel Massey, Geraldine James, Nigel Anthony. BBC Genome
- The novel was adapted by Lucy Catherine, with music by Stephen Warbeck, for broadcast on BBC Radio 3 on 15 March 2015.

=== Comic strips and graphic novels ===
Several graphic novels have been adapted from this work, by the following:

- 1997: Russian comic strip author Rodion Tanaev
- 2002: French comic strip author Jean-François Desserre
- 2005: Russian comic strip authors Askold Akishine and Misha Zaslavsky
- 2008: London-based comic strip authors Andrzej Klimowski and Danusia Schejbal.
- 2013: The Austrian/French comic-strip author Bettina Egger created a graphic novel adaptation entitled Moscou endiablé, sur les traces de Maître et Marguerite. It interweaves the story of The Master and Margarita with elements of Bulgakov's life, and her own exploration of the sources of the novel in Moscow.

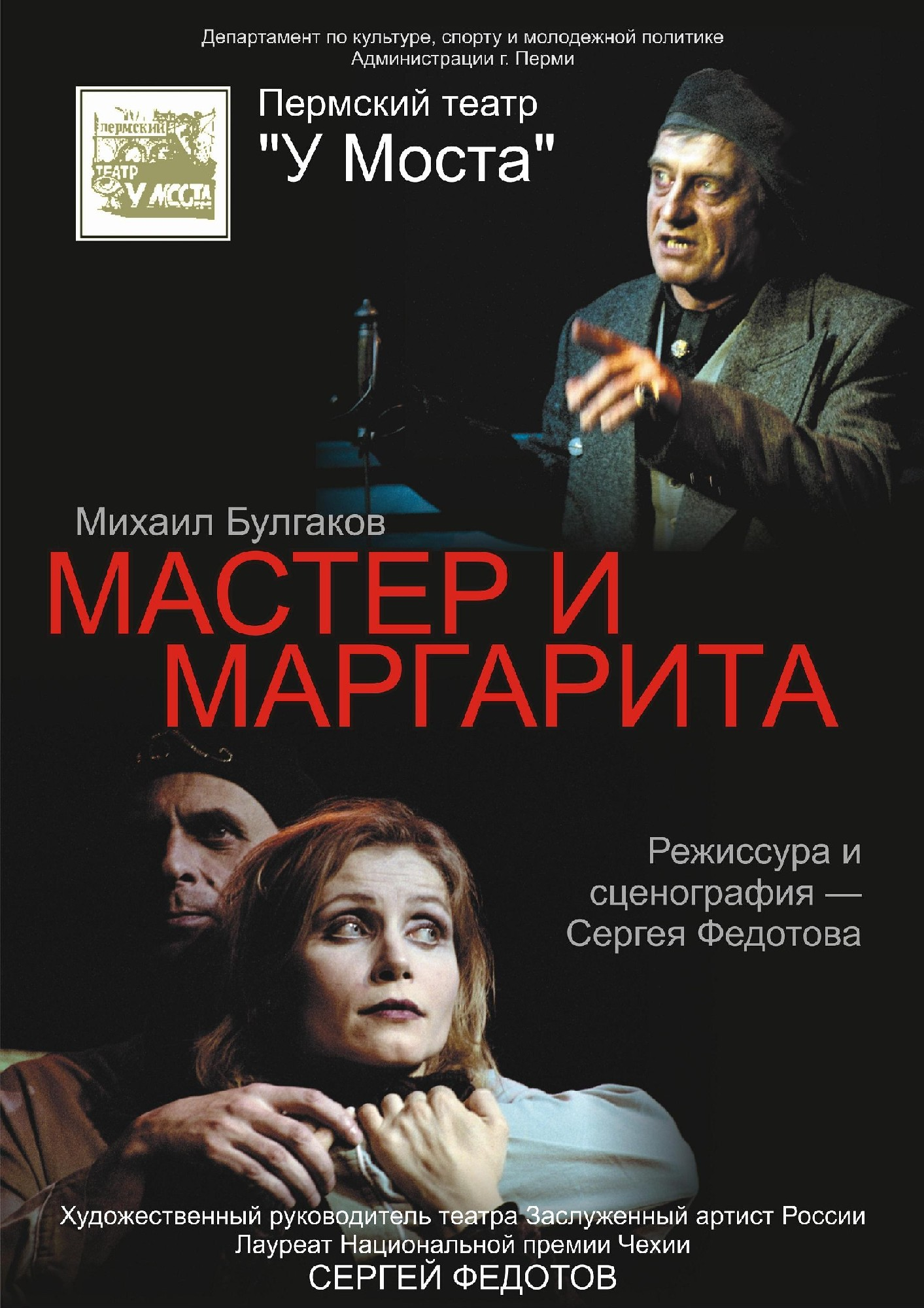
Poster for a stage adaptation of The Master and Margarita in Perm, Russia

=== Theatre ===
The Master and Margarita has been adapted on stage by more than 500 theatre companies all over the world. A full list of all versions and languages is published on the Master & Margarita website.

- 1971: from 1971 to 1977, all theatre adaptations of The Master and Margarita were Polish. They were prohibited from using the title The Master and Margarita. Titles included Black Magic and Its Exposure (Kraków, 1971), Black Magic (Katowice, 1973), Have You Seen Pontius Pilate? (Wrocław, 1974), and Patients (Wroclaw, 1976).
- 1977: An adaptation for the Russian stage was produced by the director Yuri Lyubimov at Moscow's Taganka Theatre.
- 1978: a stage adaptation was directed by Romanian-born American director Andrei Șerban at the New York Public Theater, starring John Shea. This seems to be the version revived in 1993 (see below).
- 1980: stage production (Maestrul și Margareta) directed by Romanian stage director Cătălina Buzoianu at The Small Theatre ("Teatrul Mic") in Bucharest, Romania. Cast: Ștefan Iordache as "Master"/"Yeshua Ha-Notsri"; Valeria Seciu as "Margareta"; Dan Condurache as "Woland"; Mitică Popescu as "Koroviev"; Gheorghe Visu as "Ivan Bezdomny"/"Matthew Levi"; Sorin Medeleni as "Behemoth".
- 1982: stage production (Mästaren och Margarita) directed by Swedish stage director Peter Luckhaus at the Royal Dramatic Theatre in Stockholm, Sweden – Cast: Rolf Skoglund as "Master", Margaretha Byström as "Margareta", Jan Blomberg as "Woland", Ernst-Hugo Järegård as "Berlioz"/"Stravinsky"/"Pontius Pilate", Stellan Skarsgård as "Koroviev", and Örjan Ramberg as "Ivan"/"Levi Mattei".
- 1983: stage production Saatana saapuu Moskovaan directed by Laura Jäntti for KOM-teatteri in Helsinki, Finland.
- 1991: UK premiere of an adaptation at the London Academy of Music and Dramatic Art. 3rd year professional diploma course. Director Helena Kaut-Howson. Cast includes: Katherine Kellgren, James Harper, Paul Cameron, Zen Gesner, Kirsten Clark, Polly Hayes, Abigail Hercules, Clive Darby, and Daniel Philpot.
- 1992: adaptation at the Lyric Hammersmith in June by the Four Corners theatre company. It was based on a translation by Michael Denny, adapted and directed for the stage by David Graham-Young (of Contemporary Stage). The production transferred to the Almeida Theatre in July 1992.
- 1993: the Theatre for the New City produced a revival stage adaptation in New York City, as originally commissioned by Joseph Papp and the Public Theater. The adaptation was by Jean-Claude van Itallie. It was directed by David Willinger and featured a cast of 13, including Jonathan Teague Cook as "Woland", Eric Rasmussen as "Matthew Levi", Cesar Rodriguez as "Yeshua Ha Nozri", Eran Bohem as "The Master" and Lisa Moore as "Margarita". This version was published by Dramatists Play Service, Inc. A French version, using part of van Itallie's text, was performed at the Théâtre de Mercure, Paris, directed by Andrei Serban.
- 1994: stage production at Montreal's Centaur Theatre, adapted and directed by Russian-Canadian director Alexandre Marine.
- 2000: the Israeli theater company Gesher premiered haSatan baMoskva, a musical based on the 1999 Hebrew translation of the novel. The production included song lyrics by Ehud Manor and a 23-musician orchestra. It was directed by Yevgeny Arye and starred Haim Topol, Evgeny Gamburg and Israel "Sasha" Demidov (as noted in the company history).
- 2002: a German-language stage adaptation of the novel, Der Meister und Margarita, directed by Frank Castorf, premiered at the Vienna Festival, Austria.
- 2004: an adaptation of the novel by Edward Kemp and directed by Steven Pimlott was staged in July 2004 at the Chichester Festival Theatre, UK. The cast included Samuel West as "The Master" and Michael Feast as "Woland". The production included incidental music by Jason Carr.
- 2004: the National Youth Theatre produced a new stage adaptation by David Rudkin at the Lyric Hammersmith London, directed by John Hoggarth. It featured a cast of 35 and ran from 23 August to 11 September. In 2005, Rudkin's adaptation received a production with a cast of 13 from Aberystwyth University's Department of Theatre, Film and Television Studies at the Theatr y Castell, directed by David Ian Rabey.
- 2006, October: it was staged by Grinnell College, directed by Veniamin Smekhov.
- 2006: an almost five-hour long adaptation was staged by Georgian director Avtandil Varsimashvili.
- 2007: in Helsinki, the group theatre Ryhmäteatteri staged a production named Saatana saapuu Moskovaan (Satan comes to Moscow), directed by Finnish director Esa Leskinen. Eleven actors played 26 separate roles in a three-hour production during the season 25 September 2007 – 1 March 2008.
- 2007: Alim Kouliev in Hollywood with The Master Project production started rehearsals on stage with his own adaptation of the novel The Master and Margarita. The premiere was scheduled for 14 October 2007, but was postponed. Some excerpts and information can be viewed on the Master and Margarita website.
- 2008: a Swedish stage production of Mästaren och Margarita directed by Leif Stinnerbom was performed at the Stockholm City Theatre, starring Philip Zandén (The Master), Frida Westerdahl (Margarita), Jakob Eklund (Woland) and Ingvar Hirdwall (Pilate).
- 2010: a new, original stage translation, written by Max Hoehn and Raymond Blankenhorn, was used by the Oxford University Dramatic Society Summer Tour, performing in Oxford, Battersea Arts Centre in London, and at C Venues at the Edinburgh Festival Fringe.
- 2011: Complicité premiered its new adaptation, directed by Simon McBurney at Theatre Royal Plymouth. It toured to Luxembourg, London, Madrid, Vienna, Recklinghausen, and Amsterdam. In July 2012 it toured to the Festival d'Avignon and the Grec Festival in Barcelona.
- 2018: Ljubljana Puppet Theatre premiered a special production, composed of two distinct parts (also directed by two separate artists): an interactive theatrical journey through the theater building including visual art, entitled The Devil's Triptych, and a separate "theatrical gospel" named Margareta (Margarita), taking place simultaneously inside and in front of the theater building (thus theatergoers are required to visit on multiple occasions should they wish to experience the totality of the production). This adaptation premiered in June 2018 to favorable reviews.

=== Ballet and dance ===
- In 2003, the Perm Opera and Ballet Theatre, Russia, presented Master i Margarita, a new full-length ballet set to music by Gustav Mahler, Dmitri Shostakovich, Hector Berlioz, Astor Piazzolla and other composers. Choreography and staging by David Avdysh, set design by Simon Pastukh (USA) and costume design by Galina Solovyova (USA).
- In 2007, the National Opera of Ukraine, Kyiv, premiered David Avdysh's The Master and Margarita, a ballet-phantasmagoria in two acts.
- 2010: Synetic Theater of Arlington, VA, presented a dance/performance adaptation of The Master and Margarita directed by Paata Tsikurishvili and choreographed by Irina Tsikurishvili. The show featured a cast of 16, including Paata Tsikurishvili as Master and Irina Tsikurishvili as Margarita. It ran for one month at the Lansburgh Theatre.
- In 2015, Estonian theatre Vanemuine premiered a dance adaptation "Meister ja Margarita", directed by Janek Savolainen.
- In 2021, the Bolshoi Ballet premiered a new full-length ballet named Master and Margarita, set to music by Alfred Schnitke and Milko Lazar, conducted by Anton Grishanin. Choreography by Edward Clug, set design by Marko Japelj, costume design by Leo Kulaš and lighting design by Tomaž Premzl.

=== Music ===
Hundreds of composers, bands, singers and songwriters were inspired by The Master and Margarita in their work. Some 250 songs or musical pieces have been counted about it.

==== Rock music ====
More than 35 rock bands and artists, including The Rolling Stones, Franz Ferdinand, and Pearl Jam, have been inspired by the novel.

==== Pop music ====
In pop music, more than 15 popular bands and artists, including Igor Nikolayev, Valery Leontiev, Zsuzsa Koncz, Larisa Dolina and Linda, have been inspired by the novel. Valery Leontiev's song "Margarita" was the basis of the first Russian music video, produced in 1989.

==== Russian bards ====
Many Russian bards, including Alexander Rosenbaum, have been inspired by the novel to write songs about it. They have based more than 200 songs on themes and characters from The Master and Margarita.

==== Classical music ====
A dozen classical composers, including Dmitri Smirnov and Andrey Petrov, have been inspired by the novel to write symphonies and musical phantasies about it.

2011: Australian composer and domra (Russian mandolin) player Stephen Lalor presented his "Master & Margarita Suite" of instrumental pieces in concert at the Bulgakov Museum Moscow in July 2011, performed on the Russian instruments domra, cimbalom, bass balalaika, and bayan.

==== Opera and musical theatre ====
More than 15 composers, including York Höller, Alexander Gradsky and Sergei Slonimsky, have made operas and musicals on the theme of The Master and Margarita.

- 1972: Three-act chamber opera The Master and Margarita by Russian composer Sergei Slonimsky was completed, but not allowed to be performed or published. It premiered in concert in Moscow on 20 May 1989, and the score was released in 1991. An abridged Western premiere of this work was produced in Hanover, Germany in June 2000.
- 1977: A musical adaptation (under the title "Satan's Ball") written by Richard Crane and directed by his wife Faynia Williams was presented at the Edinburgh Fringe Festival by the University of Bradford Drama Group at Bedlam Theatre. It won a Fringe First award, and garnered excellent reviews.
- 1989: The German composer York Höller's opera Der Meister und Margarita was premiered in 1989 at the Paris Opéra and released on CD in 2000.
- On 25 August 2006, Andrew Lloyd Webber announced intentions to adapt the novel as a stage musical or opera. In 2007, it was reported by Stage that he had abandoned that work.
- In late 2009, a Russian singer and composer Alexander Gradsky released a four-CD opera adaptation of the novel. It stars Gradsky as the Master, Woland, Yeshua and Behemoth; Nikolai Fomenko as Koroviev, Mikhail Seryshev (formerly of Master) as Ivan; Elena Minina as Margarita; and many renowned Russian singers and actors in episodic roles, including (but not limited to) Iosif Kobzon, Lyubov Kazarnovskaya, Andrey Makarevich, Alexander Rosenbaum, Arkady Arkanov, Gennady Khazanov and the late Georgi Millyar (voice footage from one of his movies was used).
- 2021: A musical theatre adaptation was produced by the Teatr Muzyczny w Gdyni of Gdynia, Poland, directed by Janusz Józefowicz, with music by Janusz Stokłosa, and lyrics by Yuriy Ryashentsev and Andrzej Poniedzielski.

==== Other music ====
Five alternative composers and performers, including Simon Nabatov, have been inspired by the novel to present various adaptations.

In 2009, Portuguese new media artists Video Jack premiered an audiovisual art performance inspired by the novel at Kiasma, Helsinki, as part of the PixelAche Festival. Since then, it has been shown in festivals in different countries, having won an honorable mention award at Future Places Festival, Porto. The project was released as a net art version later that year.

== See also ==
- The Gulag Archipelago
- Azazel in popular culture
- Big Read (Bulgaria)
- Big Read (Hungarian)
- Christian literature
- Devil in the arts and popular culture
- Fantastic
- Le Monde's 100 Books of the Century
- List of works published posthumously
- Magical realism
- Surrealism
- The Big Read
- Urban fantasy
- Wayland the Smith
- Works based on Faust

== Bibliography ==
- Haber, Edythe C (October 1975). "The Mythic Structure of Bulgakov's 'The Master'". The Russian Review: 382–409. doi:10.2307/127871. JSTOR 127871.
- Hart, Pierre S (Summer 1973). "The Master and Margarita as Creative Process". Modern Fiction Studies: 169–78.
- Lukács, G (1973). Studies in European Realism. Merlin.
- ——— (1974). The Meaning of Contemporary Realism. Merlin.
- Moss, Kevin (1984). "Bulgakov's 'Master and Margarita': Masking the Supernatural and the Secret Police". Russian Language Journal. 38 (129/130): 115–131. JSTOR 43669433.
- Reidel-Schrewe, Ursula (April 1995). "Key and Tripod in Mikhail Bulgakov's Master and Margarita". Neophilologus. 79 (2): 273–82. doi:10.1007/bf00999783. S2CID 161673514.
- Townsend, Dorian Aleksandra (May 2011). From Upyr' to Vampire: The Slavic Vampire Myth in Russian Literature (Ph.D.). School of German and Russian Studies, Faculty of Arts & Social Sciences, University of New South Wales.
- Vanhellemont, Jan (January 2020). The Master and Margarita - Annotations per chapter. Leuven: Vanhellemont. ISBN 978-9-081853-32-3.
- Vanhellemont, Jan (January 2021). Everything You Always Wanted To Know About The Master & Margarita. Leuven: Vanhellemont. ISBN 978-9-081853-37-8.
