= Azazello =

- The Master and Margarita character
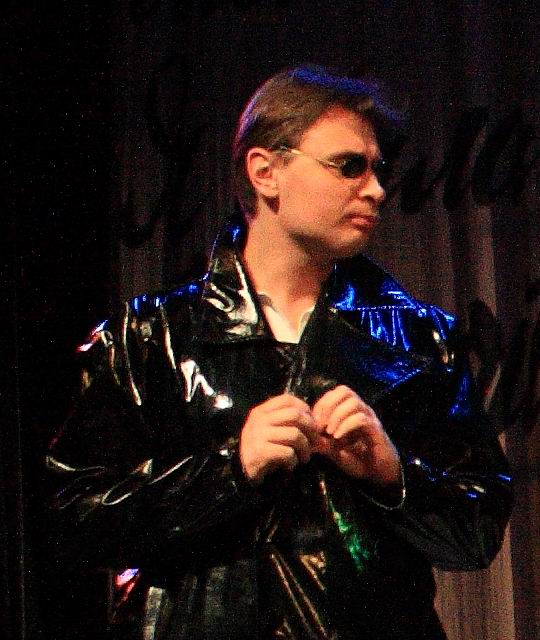
- Created by: Mikhail Bulgakov

In-universe information
- Full name: Azazello
- Species: Demon
- Gender: Male
- Occupation: Killer-demon

Azazello (in early versions of the book, Fiello, Russian: Азазелло) is a character from the novel The Master and Margarita by the Russian writer Mikhail Bulgakov. A demon, a member of Woland's entourage. "The demon of the waterless desert, the killer-demon".

== Description ==
According to Bulgakov, Azazello "turned out to be short of stature, a fiery redhead with a fang, in a starched shirt, a good-quality striped suit, patent leather shoes, and with a bowler hat on his head. His tie was brightly coloured. The surprising thing was that from the pocket where men usually carry a handkerchief or a fountain pen, this gentleman had a gnawed chicken bone sacking out."

His true appearance, however, is far from comical:

At the far side, the steel of his armour glittering, flew Azazello. The moon also changed his face. The absurd, ugly fang disappeared without a trace, and the albugo on his eye proved false. Azazello's eyes were both the same, empty and black, and his face was white and cold. Now Azazello flew in his true form, as the demon of the waterless desert, the killer-demon.

== Origins ==
Azazel or Azazael (Hebrew: עֲזָאזֵל ‘Ǎzāzêl, "Strength of God") is a term used three times in the Hebrew Bible, which has been traditionally understood either as a scapegoat, or in some traditions of Judaism, Christianity, and Islam, as the name of a fallen angel.

Azazyel taught men to make swords, knives, shields, breastplates, the fabrication of mirrors, and the workmanship of bracelets and ornaments, the use of paint, the beautifying of the eyebrows, the use of stones of every valuable and select kind, and all sorts of dyes, so that the world became altered. (Enoch 8:1)

Bulgakov was likely mesmerized by a character who was both a seducer and a killer. Margarita took him for a playboy during their first meeting at the Alexander Garden. But his main function in the novel is violence. He throws Stepan Likhodeyev from Moscow to Yalta, pushes Poplavsky out of his sinister apartment, and shoots Count Meigel to death.

In earlier versions of the novel Azazello kills Meigel with a knife, which is more appropriate for him as the inventor of all the blade weapons in the world.

In accordance with his historic role, Azazello gives Margarita his magic ointment, the Azazello Cream. It not only gave Margarita invisibility and ability to fly, but gave her bewitching beauty. In his sinister apartment, Azazello enters through a mirror, another innovation of his.
