= Woland =

Fictional character in a novel by Mikhail Bulgakov

- The Master and Margarita character
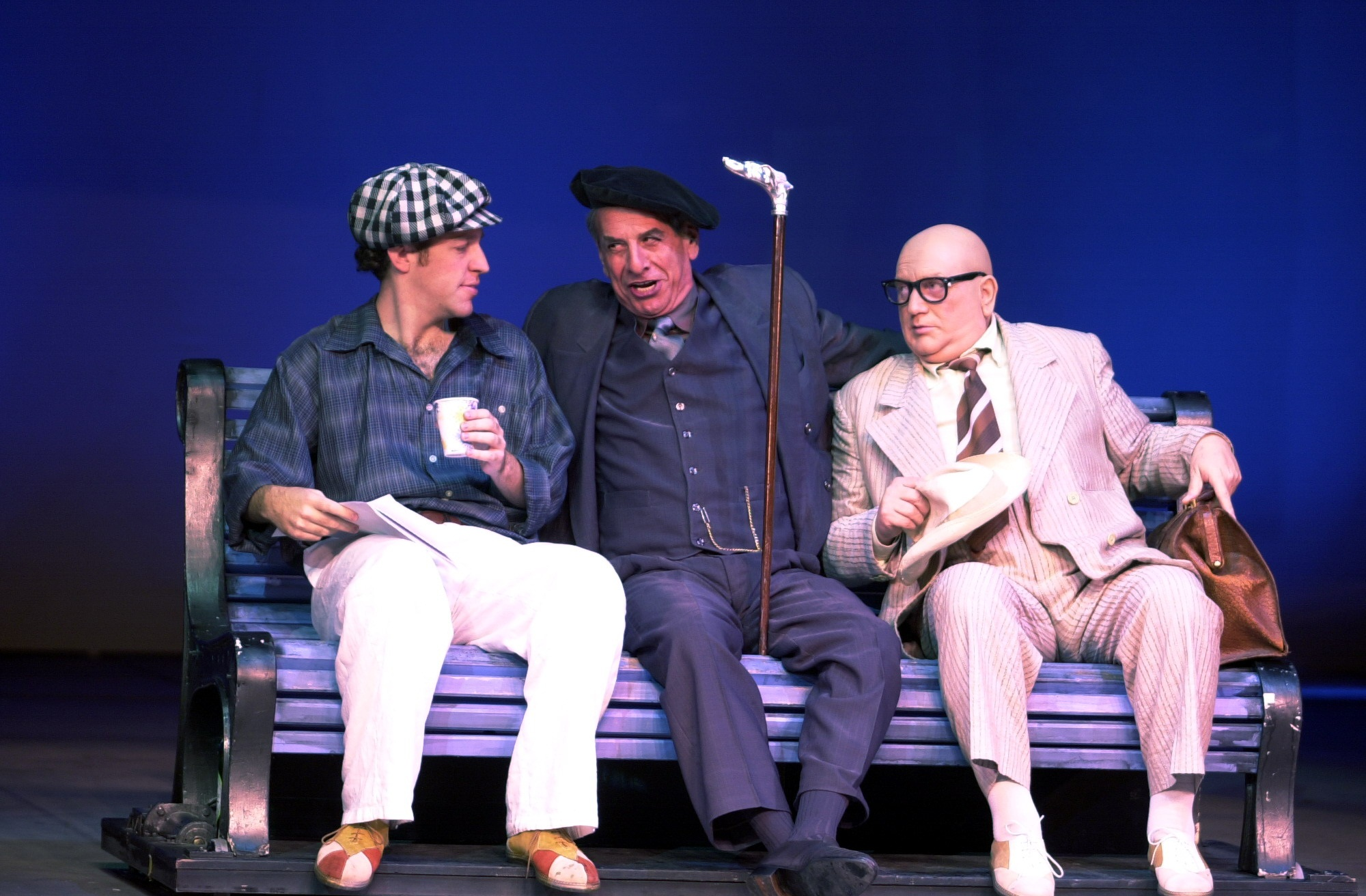
- Created by: Mikhail Bulgakov

In-universe information
- Species: Devil
- Gender: Male
- Occupation: Professor of Black magic, historian, performing artist (claimed)
- Nationality: German (claimed)

Woland (Russian: Воланд, romanized: Voland) is a fictional character in the novel The Master and Margarita by the Russian (Soviet) author Mikhail Bulgakov, written between 1928 and 1940. Woland is the mysterious foreigner and professor whose visit to Moscow sets the plot rolling and turns the world upside-down.

His demonic entourage, which includes witches, succubi, and a gigantic talking cat, his role in the plot, and the fact that Voland is a (now outdated) German word for a devil or evil spirit, all imply that he is, in fact, the Devil. More controversial interpretations see him as the Apostle Peter (based on Jesus’ remark to Peter, "Get thee behind me, Satan") or even the Second Coming of Christ.

Edward Ericson argues that Woland is essentially "the Satan of orthodox (specifically Russian Orthodox) Christian theology [...] He is both a tempter of men and an unwitting instrument of divine justice, a being who owes his existence and power to the very one he opposes."

In conceiving of Woland, Bulgakov draws heavily from the figure of Mephistopheles in Goethe's Faust, a connection made explicit by the use of an epigraph from the poem at the beginning of the novel. Additionally, the name Woland itself is derived from a name by which Mephistopheles refers to himself during the Walpurgisnacht scene: squire Voland (German: Junker Voland). Other allusions to Goethe's Mephistopheles include Woland's cane with the head of a poodle and his limp. Another influence on Woland is Charles Gounod's opera Faust.

== In adaptations ==
- Veniamin Smekhov played him in a Moscow stage adaptation.
- In the 1972 Italian-Yugoslavian adaptation, Il maestro e Margherita, Woland was played by French actor Alain Cuny.
- In the 1990 Polish TV series, Mistrz i Malgorzata, Woland was played by Gustaw Holoubek.
- In the 1994 Russian film adaptation, Woland was played by Valentin Gaft.
- In the 2005 Russian miniseries adaptation, Woland was played by Oleg Basilashvili.
- In the 2024 Russian film adaptation, Woland was played by August Diehl.

== Quotations ==
"Forgive me, but I don't believe you. That cannot be: manuscripts don't burn." - To the Master

"Yes, man is mortal, but that would be only half the trouble. The worst of it is that he's sometimes unexpectedly mortal—there's the trick!" - To Berlioz

== Works cited ==
- Bulgakov, Mikhail (2016). The Master and Margarita. Translated by Pevear, Richard; Volokhonsky, Larissa. London: Penguin. ISBN 978-0143108276.
- Бузиновский, С.; Бузиновская, О. (2007). Тайна Воланда: опыт дешифровки. St. Petersburg: Лев и Сова.
- Ericson, Edward E. (1974). "The Satanic Incarnation: Parody in Bulgakov's The Master and Margarita". The Russian Review. 33 (1): 20–36. doi:10.2307/127619. JSTOR 127619.
- Haber, Edythe C. (1975). "The Mythic Structure of Bulgakov's The Master and Margarita". The Russian Review. 34 (4): 382–409. doi:10.2307/127871. JSTOR 127871.
- Goethe, Johann Wolfgang von (1997). Faust: Eine Tragödie. Erster und zweiter Teil. Mit einem Nachwort, Anmerkungen und einer Zeittafel von Sybille Demmer. Munich: Deutscher Taschenbuch Verlag. ISBN 978-3-423-12400-3. [Note: Goethe died in 1832.]
- Lowe, David (1996). "Gounod's Faust and Bulgakov's the Master and Margarita". The Russian Review. 55 (2): 279–286. doi:10.2307/131841. JSTOR 131841.
- Wright, A.C. (1973). "Satan in Moscow: An Approach to Bulgakov's The Master and Margarita". Publications of the Modern Language Association. 88 (5): 1162–1172. doi:10.2307/461648. JSTOR 461648. S2CID 163919921.
