= List of Soviet films of 1990 =

This is a list of films produced in the Soviet Union and released in 1990.

== 1990 ==
Title	Russian title	Director	Cast	Genre	Notes
Accidental Waltz	Случайный вальс	Svetlana Proskurina	Alla Sokolova, Aleksei Serebryakov	Drama, romance	Won the Golden Leopard at the 43rd Locarno Film Festival in 1990
Adam's Rib	Ребро Адама	Vyacheslav Krishtofovich	Inna Churikova, Yelena Bogdanova	Comedy	
Afghan Breakdown	Афганский излом	Vladimir Bortko	Michele Placido, Mikhail Zhigalov, Aleksei Serebryakov, Yury Kuznetsov	War film	
The Asthenic Syndrome	Астенический синдром	Kira Muratova	Olga Antonova, Sergei Popov, Galina Stakhanova, Galina Zakhurdayeva, Nataliya Buzko	Drama	Won the Silver Bear Grand Jury Prize at the 40th Berlin International Film Festival in 1990
Autumn	Осень	Arvo Kruusement	Margus Lepa, Liina Tennosaar, Anne Reemann	Comedy	
The Battle of the Three Kings	Битва трёх королей	Souheil Ben-Barka, Uchkun Nazarov	Massimo Ghini, Ángela Molina, F. Murray Abraham, Ugo Tognazzi	Adventure	Soviet-Italian-Spanish-Moroccan co-production
Boys	Мальчики	Yuri Grigoryev, Renita Grigoryeva	Dmitry Chernigovsky, Olga Gobzeva, Lyudmila Zaytseva	Drama	
A Captive in the Land	Пленник земли	John Berry	Sam Waterston, Aleksandr Potapov, Keir Giles	Drama, survival	Soviet-American co-production; screened in the Un Certain Regard section at the 1991 Cannes Film Festival
Cloud-Paradise	Облако-рай	Nikolai Dostal	Andrei Zhigalov, Sergey Batalov, Irina Rozanova, Alla Kliouka, Anna Ovsyannikova, Vladimir Tolokonnikov, Lev Borisov	Comedy	Won the Silver Leopard, the Youth Jury Prize, the Prize of the Ecumenical Jury and the CICAE Award at the 44th Locarno Film Festival in 1991
Comrade Chkalov Crosses the North Pole	Переход товарища Чкалова через северный полюс	Maksim Pezhemsky	Aleksandr Zavyalov, Viktor Bychkov, Vladimir Baranov, Semyon Furman	Comedy	Screened in the Un Certain Regard section at the 1991 Cannes Film Festival
Deja Vu	Дежа вю	Juliusz Machulski	Jerzy Stuhr, Galina Petrova, Nikolai Karachentsov	Comedy	
Do It – One!	Делай — раз!	Andrei Malyukov	Yevgeny Mironov, Vladimir Mashkov, Alexei Burykin	Drama	
Dogs' Feast	Собачий пир	Leonid Menaker	Natalya Gundareva, Sergey Shakurov	Drama	
The Executioner	Палач	Viktor Sergeyev	Irina Metlitskaya, Andrey Sokolov	Drama	
Frenzied Bus	Взбесившийся автобус	Georgy Natanson	Ivars Kalniņš, Igor Bochkin, Anna Samokhina	Crime	
The Guard	Караул	Aleksandr Rogozhkin	Sergei Kupriyanov Aleksey Buldakov, Dmitri Iosifov, Aleksei Poluyan	Drama	Won the Alfred Bauer Prize at the 40th Berlin International Film Festival in 1990
His Nickname Is Beast	…По прозвищу «Зверь»	Aleksandr Muratov	Dmitry Pevtsov, Tatyana Skorokhodova	Action	
100 Days Before the Command	Сто дней до приказа	Hussein Erkenov	Vladimir Zamansky, Armen Dzhigarkhanyan	Drama	
I Declare War on You	Я объявляю вам войну	Yaropolk Lapshin	Nikolai Badyev, Igor Bityutskiy	Drama	
Interpretation of Dreams	Толкование сновидений	Andrei Zagdansky	Sergei Yursky (narrator)	Documentary	Austrian-Soviet co-production
Mado, Hold for Pick Up	Мадо, до востребования	Aleksandr Adabashyan	Marianne Groves, Oleg Yankovsky, Jean-Pierre Darroussin, Isabelle Gélinas	Drama, romance	French-Soviet co-production
Mother	Мать	Gleb Panfilov	Inna Churikova, Viktor Rakov	Drama	
My Seawoman	Моя морячка	Anatoly Eiramdzhan	Lyudmila Gurchenko, Tatyana Vasilyeva	Comedy	
Nikolai Vavilov	Николай Вавилов	Aleksandr Proshkin	Kostas Smoriginas, Andrey Martynov, Irina Kupchenko, Bohdan Stupka	Biopic	Soviet-German co-production
Only for Crazy	Только для сумасшедших	Arvo Iho	Margarita Terekhova, Hendrik Toompere Sr., Hendrik Toompere Jr.	Drama	
The Parrot Speaking Yiddish	Попугай, говорящий на идиш	Efraim Sevela	Ramaz Ioseliani, Avangard Leontiev, Maria Politseymako	Adventure	
Passport	Паспорт	Georgiy Daneliya	Gérard Darmon, Natalya Gundareva, Oleg Yankovsky, Armen Dzhigarkhanyan, Yevgeny Leonov, Leonid Yarmolnik	Adventure	
Private Detective, or Operation Cooperation	Частный детектив или операция «Кооперация»	Leonid Gaidai	Dmitry Kharatyan, Irina Feofanova, Spartak Mishulin	Comedy	
The Second Circle	Круг второй	Alexander Sokurov	Pyotr Aleksandrov, Nadezhda Rodnova	Drama	
The Shore of Salvation	Берег спасения	Arya Dashiyev, Ryu Ho-son	Boris Nevzorov, Viktor Stepanov	Action	Soviet-North Korean co-production
Sideburns	Бакенбарды	Yuri Mamin	Viktor Sukhorukov	Comedy	
The Sisters Liberty	Сестрички Либерти	Vladimir Grammatikov	Olga Stuchilova, Elena Stuchilova	Drama	
Sons of Bitches	Сукины дети	Leonid Filatov	Vladimir Ilyin, Larisa Udovichenko, Aleksandr Abdulov, Yevgeny Yevstigneyev, Liya Akhedzhakova, Vladimir Samoilov	Drama	Entered into the 17th Moscow International Film Festival in 1991
Spotted Dog Running at the Edge of the Sea	Пегий пёс, бегущий краем моря	Karen Gevorkian	Bayarta Dambayev, Aleksandr Sasykov, Doskhan Zholzhaksynov	Drama	Won the Golden Saint George at the 17th Moscow International Film Festival in 1991
Stalin's Funeral	Похороны Сталина	Yevgeny Yevtushenko	Vanessa Redgrave, Aleksey Batalov, Georgi Yumatov	Drama	
Stalingrad	Сталинград	Yuri Ozerov	Powers Boothe, Mikhail Ulyanov, Bruno Freindlich, Fernando Allende, Sergei Garmash	War film	Soviet-East German-Czechoslovak-American co-production
The Suicide	Самоубийца	Valery Pendrakovsky	Sergey Shakurov, Leonid Kuravlyov, Aleksandr Trofimov	Comedy	
The Swarm	Рой	Vladimir Khotinenko	Vladimir Ilin, Cheslav Sushkevich	Drama	
Taxi Blues	Такси-блюз	Pavel Lungin	Pyotr Mamonov, Pyotr Zaychenko, Natalya Kolyakanova, Yelena Safonova, Vladimir Kashpur, Hal Singer, Sergey Gazarov, Yevgeny Gerchakov, Dmitri Prigov, Igor Zolotovitsky, Valeri Khlevinsky	Drama	Lungin won the Cannes Film Festival Award for Best Director while the film was submitted to the 63rd Academy Awards for Best Foreign Language Film in 1991, but was not accepted as a nominee
Trap for a Lonely Man	Ловушка для одинокого мужчины	Alexey Korenev	Nikolai Karachentsov, Yury Yakovlev, Irina Shmelyova	Comedy	
Vagrant Bus	Бродячий автобус	Iosif Kheifits	Lev Borisov, Mikhail Zhigalov, Afanasi Trishkin, Liya Akhedzhakova	Drama	
Werewolf Hour	Час оборотня	Igor Shevchenko	Mikhail Pakhomenko, Aleksandr Baluev	Horror	Rediscovered in 2021
Whit Monday	Духов день	Sergey Selyanov	Yuriy Shevchuk, Boris Golyatkin	Sci-fi	
Yearning	Тоска	Frunze Dovlatyan	Galya Novents, Ashot Melikjanyan	Drama	
