= Postmodernist film =

Film genre

Postmodernist film is a classification for works that articulate the themes and ideas of postmodernism through the medium of cinema. Some of the goals of postmodernist film are to subvert the mainstream conventions of narrative structure and characterization, and to test the audience's suspension of disbelief. Typically, such films also break down the cultural divide between high and low art and often upend typical portrayals of gender, race, class, genre, and time with the goal of creating something that does not abide by traditional narrative expression.

== Specific elements ==
Modernist film came to maturity in the era between WWI and WWII with characteristics such as montage and symbolic imagery, and often took the form of expressionist cinema and surrealist cinema (as seen in the works of Fritz Lang and Luis Buñuel) while postmodernist film – similar to postmodernism as a whole – is a reaction to the modernist works and to their tendencies (such as nostalgia and angst). Modernist cinema has been said to have "explored and exposed the formal concerns of the medium by placing them at the forefront of consciousness. Modernist cinema questions and made visible the meaning-production practices of film." The auteur theory and idea of an author creating a work from their singular vision was a cultural advancement that coincided with the further maturation of modernist cinema. It has been said that "To investigate the transparency of the image is modernist but to undermine its reference to reality is to engage with the aesthetics of postmodernism." The modernist film has more faith in the author, the individual, and the accessibility of reality itself than the postmodernist film, and is generally more sincere in tone.

Postmodernism is in many ways interested in the liminal space that would be typically ignored by more modernist or traditionally narrative offerings. Henri Bergson writes in his book Creative Evolution:

The obscurity is cleared up, the contradiction vanishes, as soon as we place ourselves along the transition, in order to distinguish states in it by making cross cuts therein in thoughts. The reason is that there is more in the transition than the series of states, that is to say, the possible cuts – more in the movement than the series of position, that is to say, the possible stops.

Postmodernist film is often separated from modernist cinema and traditional narrative film by three key characteristics. One of them is an extensive use of homage or pastiche. The second element is meta-reference or self-reflexivity, highlighting the construction and relation of the image to other images in media and not to any kind of external reality. A self-referential film calls the viewer's attention – either through characters' knowledge of their own fictional nature, or through visuals – that the film itself is only a film. This is sometimes achieved by emphasizing the unnatural look of an image which seems contrived. Another technique used to achieve meta-reference is the use of intertextuality, in which the film's characters reference or discuss other works of fiction. Additionally, many postmodern films tell stories that unfold out of chronological order, deconstructing or fragmenting time so as to highlight the fact that what is appearing on screen is constructed. A third common element is a bridging of the gap between highbrow and lowbrow activities and artistic styles, e.g. a parody of Michelangelo's Sistine Chapel ceiling in which Adam is reaching for a McDonald's burger rather than the hand of God. The use of homage and pastiche can, in and of itself, result in a fusion of high and low art. Lastly, contradictions of all sorts – whether it be in visual technique, characters' morals, etc. – are crucial to postmodernism.

== Specific postmodern examples ==
=== Once Upon a Time in the West ===
Sergio Leone's Once Upon a Time in the West has often been referred to by critics as an example of a postmodern Western. The 1968 spaghetti Western revolves around a beautiful widow, a mysterious gunslinger playing a harmonica, a ruthless villain, and a lovable but hard-nosed bandit who just escaped from jail. The story was developed by Leone, Bernardo Bertolucci, and Dario Argento by watching classic American Westerns, and the final product is a deliberate attempt to both pay homage to and subvert Western genre conventions and audience expectations. Among the most notable examples of intertextuality are the plot similarities to Johnny Guitar, the visual reference to High Noon of a clock stopped at high noon in the middle of a gunfight, and the casting of Henry Fonda as the story's sadistic antagonist which was a deliberate subversion of Fonda's image as a hero established in such films as My Darling Clementine and Fort Apache, both directed by John Ford.

=== Blade Runner ===
Ridley Scott's Blade Runner might be the best-known postmodernist film. Scott's 1982 film is about a future dystopia where "replicants" (artificial humanoids) have been invented and are deemed dangerous enough to hunt down when they escape. There is tremendous effacement of boundaries between genres and cultures, and styles that are generally more separate, along with the fusion of disparate styles and times, a common trope in postmodernist cinema. The fusion of noir and science-fiction is another example of the film deconstructing cinema and genre. This embodies the postmodern tendency to destroy boundaries and genres into a self-reflexive product. The 2017 Academy Award-winning sequel Blade Runner 2049 also tackled postmodern anxieties.

=== Pulp Fiction ===
Quentin Tarantino's Pulp Fiction is another example of a postmodernist film. The Palme d'Or-winning film tells the interweaving stories of gangsters, a boxer, and robbers. The 1994 film breaks down chronological time and demonstrates a particular fascination with intertextuality: bringing in texts from both traditionally "high" and "low" realms of art. This foregrounding of media places the self as "a loose, transitory combination of media consumption choices." Pulp Fiction fractures time (by the use of asynchronous time lines) and by using styles of prior decades and combining them together in the movie. By focusing on intertextuality and the subjectivity of time, Pulp Fiction demonstrates the postmodern obsession with signs and subjective perspective as the exclusive location of anything resembling meaning.

=== Other selected examples ===
Aside from the aforementioned works, modern and postmodern cinema includes films such as:

==== 20th century ====
- Blackmail (1929)
- Rynox (1932)
- Hellzapoppin' (1941)
- The Big Sleep (1946)
- Out of the Past (1947)
- Film Without a Title (1948)
- Sunset Boulevard (1950)
- Glen or Glenda (1953)
- Duck Amuck (1953)
- Jail Bait (1954)
- All That Heaven Allows (1955)
- Bride of the Monster (1955)
- Written on the Wind (1956)
- Plan 9 from Outer Space (1957)
- A Movie (1958)
- How to Make a Monster (1958)
- Touch of Evil (1958)
- Night of the Ghouls (1958)
- A Groom from the Other World (1958)
- Hiroshima mon amour (1959)
- A Bucket of Blood (1959)
- Breathless (1960)
- L'Avventura (1960)
- Psycho (1960)
- The Sinister Urge (1960)
- Blast of Silence (1961)
- Last Year at Marienbad (1961)
- West Side Story (1961)
- Viridiana (1961)
- A Woman Is a Woman (1961)
- Vivre sa Vie (1962)
- Cheryomushki (1962)
- 8½ (1963)
- Le Mepris (1963)
- Scorpio Rising (1963)
- The Raven (1963)
- Dr. Strangelove (1964)
- Woman in the Dunes (1964)
- A Fistful of Dollars (1964)
- A Married Woman (1964)
- Shadows of Forgotten Ancestors (1965)
- Film (1965)
- Pierrot Le Fou (1965)
- Time Piece (1965)
- Operation Y and Shurik's Other Adventures (1965)
- The Debussy Film (1965)
- Juliet of the Spirits (1965)
- Alphaville (1965)
- Persona (1966)
- What's Up, Tiger Lily? (1966)
- Masculin Féminin (1966)
- Batman (1966)
- Blowup (1966)
- Cul-de-sac (1966)
- Trans-Europ-Express (1966)
- I Am Curious (Yellow) (1967)
- Kidnapping, Caucasian Style (1967)
- Weekend (1967)
- Branded to Kill (1967)
- Casino Royale (1967)
- David Holzman's Diary (1967)
- Playtime (1967)
- La Chinoise (1967)
- Spider Baby (1967)
- Two or Three Things I Know About Her (1967)
- Kinoautomat (1967)
- Yellow Submarine (1968)
- The Movie Orgy (1968)
- Night of the Living Dead (1968)
- The Golden Calf (1968)
- Symbiopsychotaxiplasm: Take One (1968)
- Targets (1968)
- Teorema (1968)
- Death by Hanging (1968)
- Head (1968)
- 2001: A Space Odyssey (1968)
- Lions Love (1969)
- The Color of Pomegranates (1969)
- Funeral Parade of Roses (1969)
- The Diamond Arm (1969)
- Nerosubianco (1969)
- Fellini Satyricon (1969)
- Eros + Massacre (1969)
- Hi, Mom! (1970)
- The Honeymoon Killers (1970)
- Performance (1970)
- The Conformist (1970)
- The Bird with the Crystal Plumage (1970)
- Awakening of the Beast (1970)
- El Topo (1970)
- Cuadecuc, vampir (1970)
- A Clockwork Orange (1971)
- Necromania (1971)
- 200 Motels (1971)
- Bananas (1971)
- Throw Away Your Books, Rally in the Streets (1971)
- Sisters (1972)
- Roma (1972)
- The Butterfly (1972)
- Pilate and Others (1972)
- The Discreet Charm of the Bourgeoisie (1972)
- Everything You Always Wanted to Know About Sex* (*But Were Afraid to Ask) (1972)
- Ludwig: Requiem for a Virgin King (1972)
- Tout Va Bien (1972)
- Badlands (1973)
- The Holy Mountain (1973)
- Johnny Corncob (1973)
- The Long Goodbye (1973)
- American Graffiti (1973)
- The Exorcist (1973)
- Le Magnifique (1973)
- Mean Streets (1973)
- Ivan Vasilievich changes his profession (1973)
- Amarcord (1973)
- F for Fake (1973)
- Sleeper (1973)
- Day for Night (1973)
- Blazing Saddles (1974)
- Pastoral: To Die in the Country (1974)
- Phantom of the Paradise (1974)
- Celine and Julie Go Boating (1974)
- Chinatown (1974)
- Karl May (1974)
- Young Frankenstein (1974)
- Coonskin (1975)
- Tommy (1975)
- The Travelling Players (1975)
- Monty Python and the Holy Grail (1975)
- Hedgehog in the Fog (1975)
- Salò, or the 120 Days of Sodom (1975)
- Obsession (1976)
- Taxi Driver (1976)
- Carrie (1976)
- Star Wars (1977)
- The American Friend (1977)
- The Hunters (1977)
- Close Encounters of the Third Kind (1977)
- House (1977)
- Hitler: A Film from Germany (1977)
- Eraserhead (1977)
- Annie Hall (1977)
- Dawn of the Dead (1978)
- Invasion of the Body Snatchers (1978)
- Superman (1978)
- The Hypothesis of the Stolen Painting (1978)
- Hallucinations of a Deranged Mind (1978)
- The Fury (1978)
- Interiors (1978)
- Grease (1978)
- Getting to Know the Big, Wide World (1978)
- Piranha (1978)
- Jubilee (1978)
- All That Jazz (1979)
- Alien (1979)
- The Tempest (1979)
- Manhattan (1979)
- Stalker (1979)
- Die Ehe der Maria Braun (1979)
- Apocalypse Now (1979)
- Mad Max (1979)
- The Ninth Configuration (1980)
- The Gods Must Be Crazy (1980)
- The Blues Brothers (1980)
- The Shining (1980)
- The Life and Times of Rosie the Riveter (1980)
- Raging Bull (1980)
- Dressed to Kill (1980)
- Stardust Memories (1980)
- The Falls (1980)
- The French Lieutenant's Woman (1981)
- Diva (1981)
- Escape from New York (1981)
- Raiders of the Lost Ark (1981)
- Pennies from Heaven (1981)
- The Evil Dead (1981) and Evil Dead II (1987)
- American Pop (1981)
- The Howling (1981)
- Ms. 45 (1981)
- My Dinner with Andre (1981)
- Ragtime (1981)
- Blow Out (1981)
- The Great Muppet Caper (1981)
- Do You Remember Dolly Bell? (1981)
- Lili Marleen (1981)
- Kamikaze 1989 (1982)
- The Thing (1982)
- The Atomic Cafe (1982)
- On Top of the Whale (1982)
- Veronika Voss (1982)
- Koyaanisqatsi (1982)
- Vincent (1982)
- Dead Men Don't Wear Plaid (1982)
- Fall Guy (1982)
- Liquid Sky (1982)
- Passion (1982)
- A Midsummer Night's Sex Comedy (1982)
- The Entity (1982)
- The Draughtsman's Contract (1982)
- A Letter to Freddy Buache (1982)
- Sans Soleil (1983)
- Videodrome (1983)
- Doomed Love (1983)
- Carmen (1983)
- Zelig (1983)
- Love Streams (1984)
- A Nightmare on Elm Street (1984)
- Repo Man (1984)
- Streets of Fire (1984)
- Stop Making Sense (1984)
- Body Double (1984)
- Radioactive Dreams (1984)
- The Terminator (1984)
- Decoder (1984)
- This Is Spinal Tap (1984)
- Indiana Jones and the Temple of Doom (1984)
- Werewolf Paramedics (1984)
- After Hours (1985)
- My Beautiful Laundrette (1985)
- Pee-wee's Big Adventure (1985)
- The Legend of Suram Fortress (1985)
- The Purple Rose of Cairo (1985)
- Demons (1985)
- When Father Was Away on Business (1985)
- Re-Animator (1985)
- Brazil (1985)
- Kiss of the Spider Woman (1985)
- Mishima: A Life in Four Chapters (1985)
- Shoah (1985)
- Broken Down Film (1985)
- Desperately Seeking Susan (1985)
- Tampopo (1985)
- Platoon (1986)
- L'Île au trésor (1986)
- Terrorizers (1986)
- Mauvais Sang (1986)
- Mémoire des apparences (1986)
- Henry: Portrait of a Serial Killer (1986)
- Nem Tudo É Verdade (1986)
- Blue Velvet (1986)
- Caravaggio (1986)
- Salvador (1986)
- The Name of the Rose (1986)
- A Zed and Two Noughts (1986)
- Kin-dza-dza! (1986)
- Friday the 13th Part VI: Jason Lives (1986)
- Something Wild (1986)
- Ferris Bueller's Day Off (1986)
- Sunday in the Park with George (1986)
- Repentance (1987)
- Tractors (1987)
- Opera (1987)
- Bad Taste (1987)
- Walker (1987)
- Anguish (1987)
- The Princess Bride (1987)
- Spaceballs (1987)
- The Last of England (1987)
- The Severe Illness of Men (1987)
- Innerspace (1987)
- King Lear (1987)
- Change of Fate (1987)
- Wings of Desire (1987)
- Assa (1987)
- Epidemic (1987)
- Another Woman (1988)
- Boar Suicide (1988)
- Om-Dar-B-Dar (1988)
- The Needle (1988)
- Scrooged (1988)
- Akira (1988)
- Beetlejuice (1988)
- Little Vera (1988)
- Hairspray (1988)
- Red Sorghum (1988)
- Days of Eclipse (1988)
- Lady in White (1988)
- The Thin Blue Line (1988)
- Who Framed Roger Rabbit (1988)
- They Live (1988)
- My Neighbor Totoro (1988)
- Treasure Island (1988)
- The Adventures of Baron Munchausen (1988)
- A Short Film About Love (1988)
- When Harry Met Sally (1989)
- Batman (1989)
- Crimes and Misdemeanors (1989)
- Jesus of Montreal (1989)
- sex, lies and videotape (1989)
- Creature Comforts (1989)
- Roger & Me (1989)
- Born on the Fourth of July (1989)
- The Wallace and Gromit film series (1989–present)
- Black Rose Is an Emblem of Sorrow, Red Rose Is an Emblem of Love (1989)
- Split (1989)
- The Asthenic Syndrome (1989)
- Edward Scissorhands (1990)
- Close-Up (1990)
- Rosencrantz & Guildenstern Are Dead (1990)
- Cry-Baby (1990)
- Goodfellas (1990)
- Total Recall (1990)
- Gremlins 2: The New Batch (1990)
- Wild at Heart (1990)
- Miller's Crossing (1990)
- The Garden (1990)
- Dreams (1990)
- Comrade Chkalov Crosses the North Pole (1990)
- House under the Starry Sky (1991)
- Barton Fink (1991)
- The Doors (1991)
- Malina (1991)
- Hook (1991)
- Into the Woods (1991)
- JFK (1991)
- Hudson Hawk (1991)
- The Double Life of Veronique (1991)
- The Silence of the Lambs (1991)
- Naked Lunch (1991)
- A Brighter Summer Day (1991)
- Until the End of the World (1991)
- Prospero's Books (1991)
- Wax or the Discovery of Television Among the Bees (1991)
- Anna Karamazoff (1991)
- Edward II (1991)
- Aladdin (1992)
- Death and the Compass (1992)
- Cool World (1992)
- The Shadow Play (1992)
- Orlando (1992)
- Husbands and Wives (1992)
- The Player (1992)
- Jamón jamón (1992)
- Reservoir Dogs (1992)
- Wayne's World (1992)
- Raising Cain (1992)
- Freejack (1992)
- Man Bites Dog (1992)
- Braindead (1992)
- Dreams of an idiot (1993)
- The Trial (1993)
- Falling Down (1993)
- Groundhog Day (1993)
- Jurassic Park (1993)
- Last Action Hero (1993)
- The Nightmare Before Christmas (1993)
- The Piano (1993)
- Sleepless in Seattle (1993)
- Short Cuts (1993)
- Three Colours trilogy (1993-1994)
- Farewell My Concubine (1993)
- True Romance (1993)
- Plenniki udachi (1993)
- Schindler's List (1993)
- Through the Olive Trees (1994)
- Libido Bendzhamina (1994)
- Sátántangó (1994)
- Wes Craven's New Nightmare (1994)
- Faust (1994)
- Chungking Express (1994)
- Forrest Gump (1994)
- Burnt by the Sun (1994) and Burnt by the Sun 2: Exodus (2010)
- Natural Born Killers (1994)
- The Hudsucker Proxy (1994)
- The Cremaster Cycle (1994-2002)
- Serial Mom (1994)
- Assia and the Hen with the Golden Eggs (1994)
- Clerks (1994)
- Fallen Angels (1995)
- The Brady Bunch Movie (1995)
- Casino (1995)
- Dead Man (1995)
- Braveheart (1995)
- Get Shorty (1995)
- Jumanji (1995)
- Kicking and Screaming (1995)
- Saalam Cinema (1995)
- Underground (1995)
- Living in Oblivion (1995)
- Heat (1995)
- Dracula: Dead and Loving It (1995)
- Showgirls (1995)
- Waterworld (1995)
- Shirli-myrli (1995)
- Evita (1996)
- A Moment of Innocence (1996)
- Fargo (1996)
- Prisoner of the Mountains (1996)
- The Pillow Book (1996)
- From Dusk till Dawn (1996)
- Genre (1996)
- Schizopolis (1996)
- The Bandit (1996)
- Romeo + Juliet (1996)
- Goodbye South, Goodbye (1996)
- The Scream series (1996–present)
- Irma Vep (1996)
- The Watermelon Woman (1996)
- Breaking the Waves (1996)
- Crash (1996)
- Burn Hollywood Burn (1997)
- Brother (1997)
- End of Evangelion (1997)
- The Mirror (1997)
- Chasing Amy (1997)
- Wag the Dog (1997)
- I Know What You Did Last Summer (1997)
- Jackie Brown (1997)
- Austin Powers: International Man of Mystery (1997)
- Lost Highway (1997)
- Gummo (1997)
- Boogie Nights (1997)
- Starship Troopers (1997)
- Titanic (1997)
- Funny Games (1997)
- Perfect Blue (1997)
- Jack Frost (1997)
- Mama Don't Cry (1997)
- Deconstructing Harry (1997)
- Enemy of the State (1998)
- Dark City (1998)
- The Big Lebowski (1998)
- New Rose Hotel (1998)
- Run Lola Run (1998)
- The Barber of Siberia (1998)
- The Hole (1998)
- The Truman Show (1998)
- Pleasantville (1998)
- Happiness (1998)
- Armageddon (1998)
- Small Soldiers (1998)
- Shakespeare in Love (1998)
- You've Got Mail (1998)
- Of Freaks and Men (1998)
- Antz (1998)
- Terror Firmer (1998)
- Fear and Loathing in Las Vegas (1998)
- Eyes Wide Shut (1999)
- Ghost Dog: The Way of the Samurai (1999)
- The Sixth Sense (1999)
- Being John Malkovich (1999)
- Fight Club (1999)
- The Straight Story (1999)
- American Beauty (1999)
- Titus (1999)
- 8 ½ $ (1999)
- The Lord's Lantern in Budapest (1999)
- Fantasia 2000 (1999)
- The Blair Witch Project (1999)
- eXistenZ (1999)
- The Matrix (1999)
- Magnolia (1999)
- Dogma (1999)
- Three Kings (1999)
- The Ninth Gate (1999)
- American Psycho (2000)
- Psycho Beach Party (2000)
- Chicken Run (2000)
- Memento (2000)
- Erin Brockovich (2000)
- Dancer in the Dark (2000)
- Almost Famous (2000)
- The Heart of the World (2000)
- Amores perros (2000)
- Werckmeister Harmonies (2000)
- Requiem for a Dream (2000)
- The New Bremen Town Musicians (2000)
- Traffic (2000)
- Timecode (2000)
- Rejected (2000)
- Scary Movie (2000)
- The Emperor's New Groove (2000)
- Bayaning 3rd World (2000)
- Final Destination (2000)
- The Adventures of Rocky and Bullwinkle (2000)
- Combat d'amour en songe (2000)
- In the Mood for Love (2000)
- Songs from the Second Floor (2000)

==== 21st century ====
- Nonfilm (2001)
- Spirited Away (2001)
- Down House (2001)
- The Majestic (2001)
- Moulin Rouge! (2001)
- Monkeybone (2001)
- Jay and Silent Bob Strike Back (2001)
- The Shrek series (2001–present)
- Waking Life (2001)
- Mulholland Drive (2001)
- Donnie Darko (2001)
- All About Lily Chou-Chou (2001)
- The Man Who Wasn't There (2001)
- Pulse (2001)
- A Beautiful Mind (2001)
- The Royal Tenenbaums (2001)
- Pearl Harbor (2001)
- Millennium Actress (2001)
- Far From Heaven (2002)
- The Hours (2002)
- Russian Ark (2002)
- Talk to Her (2002)
- 24 Hour Party People (2002)
- Hollywood Ending (2002)
- The Resident Evil series (2002–2026)
- Reflections of Evil (2002)
- Tamala 2010: A Punk Cat in Space (2002)
- Full Frontal (2002)
- Adaptation (2002)
- A Prayer for Hetman Mazepa (2002)
- Minority Report (2002)
- Ararat (2002)
- Cicuta (2003)
- Oldboy (2003)
- Down with Love (2003)
- Lost in Translation (2003)
- The Fog of War (2003)
- The Five Obstructions (2003)
- Looney Tunes: Back in Action (2003)
- Zatōichi (2003)
- 21 Grams (2003)
- Party Monster (2003)
- The Triplets of Belleville (2003)
- O Signo do Caos (2003)
- Dogville (2003)
- Elephant (2003)
- Pinjar (2003)
- House of 1000 Corpses (2003)
- Good Bye, Lenin! (2003)
- American Splendor (2003)
- Eternal Sunshine of the Spotless Mind (2004)
- Team America: World Police (2004)
- Guide (2004)
- Night Watch (2004)
- A Family Finds Entertainment (2004)
- Tropical Malady (2004)
- The Machinist (2004)
- Shaun of the Dead (2004)
- The Life Aquatic with Steve Zissou (2004)
- Kill Bill (2004)
- Howl's Moving Castle (2004)
- I Heart Huckabees (2004)
- 4 (2004)
- Brick (2005)
- Lovelorn (2005)
- Manderlay (2005)
- Grizzly Man (2005)
- A Cock and Bull Story (2005)
- The Devil's Rejects (2005)
- The Last Mitterrand (2005)
- Takeshis (2005)
- Corpse Bride (2005)
- Dead Man's Bluff (2005)
- A History of Violence (2005)
- The Wayward Cloud (2005)
- The League of Gentlemen's Apocalypse (2005)
- Hostel (2005)
- Southland Tales (2006)
- Euphoria (2006)
- Behind the Mask: The Rise of Leslie Vernon (2006)
- Still Life (2006)
- Marie Antoinette (2006)
- Idiocracy (2006)
- Paprika (2006)
- It Doesn't Hurt Me (2006)
- Stranger than Fiction (2006)
- Electroma (2006)
- Brand upon the Brain! (2006)
- The Postmodern Life of My Aunt (2006)
- Déjà Vu (2006)
- A Scanner Darkly (2006)
- The Lives of Others (2006)
- Pan's Labyrinth (2006)
- The Da Vinci Code (2006)
- Khottabych (2006)
- Borat (2006)
- The Fall (2006)
- Babel (2006)
- The Island (2006)
- Death Proof (2007)
- Enchanted (2007)
- No Smoking (2007)
- Hot Fuzz (2007)
- Sweeney Todd (2007)
- Eye in the Sky (2007)
- 12 (2007)
- 99 Francs (2007)
- My Winnipeg (2007)
- Gloss (2007)
- 4 Months, 3 Weeks and 2 Days (2007)
- The Darjeeling Limited (2007)
- I-Be Area (2007)
- I'm Not There (2007)
- We Are the Strange (2007)
- Paranormal Activity (2007)
- No Country for Old Men (2007)
- Cargo 200 (2007)
- Sweeney Todd (2007)
- Slipstream (2007)
- Our Ten Years (2007)
- Persepolis (2007)
- Planet Terror (2007)
- The Best Movie (2008)
- The Beaches of Agnès (2008)
- Morphine (2008)
- Synecdoche, New York (2008)
- Hunger (2008)
- Paper Soldier (2008)
- Bronson (2008)
- Cloverfield (2008)
- Admiral (2008)
- Waltz with Bashir (2008)
- The Memories of Angels (2008)
- Son of the Sun (2008)
- Hitler Goes Kaput (2008)
- Tropic Thunder (2008)
- Oxygen (2009)
- Strella (2009)
- Enter the Void (2009)
- Antichrist (2009)
- Avatar (2009)
- A Serious Man (2009)
- Watchmen (2009)
- Cold Souls (2009)
- A Town Called Panic (2009)
- Drag Me to Hell (2009)
- Dogtooth (2009)
- Wolfy (2009)
- Angels & Demons (2009)
- Kick-Ass (2010)
- Shutter Island (2010)
- Rubber (2010)
- True Grit (2010)
- The Social Network (2010)
- Exit Through the Gift Shop (2010)
- Film Socialisme (2010)
- Inception (2010)
- Scott Pilgrim vs. the World (2010)
- A Stoker (2010)
- Catfish (2010)
- Drive (2011)
- Sucker Punch (2011)
- Chapiteau-show (2011)
- The Skin I Live In (2011)
- Rango (2011)
- Boris Godunov (2011)
- Melancholia (2011)
- Shame (2011)
- Detention (2011)
- We Need to Talk About Kevin (2011)
- Generation P (2011)
- Midnight in Paris (2011)
- Suicide Room (2011)
- KikoRiki: Team Invincible (2011)
- The Extremely Tragic Story of Celal Tan and His Family (2011)
- The Mill and the Cross (2011)
- Ivan Tsarevich and the Gray Wolf (2011)
- Grave Encounters (2011)
- Juan of the Dead (2011)
- The Tragedy of Man (2011)
- Abraham Lincoln: Vampire Hunter (2012)
- The Act of Killing (2012)
- Berberian Sound Studio (2012)
- Tabu (2012)
- Eternal Return (2012)
- Cloud Atlas (2012)
- Holy Motors (2012)
- Me Too (2012)
- Django Unchained (2012)
- ParaNorman (2012)
- Post Tenebras Lux (2012)
- Frankenweenie (2012)
- Wreck-It Ralph (2012)
- Seven Psychopaths (2012)
- Cosmopolis (2012)
- Hotel Transylvania (2012)
- Room 237 (2012)
- Stories We Tell (2012)
- Moonrise Kingdom (2012)
- The Cabin in the Woods (2012)
- Life of Pi (2012)
- Mondomanila (2012)
- Long Bridge In the Right Direction (2012)
- Pain & Gain (2013)
- Go Goa Gone (2013)
- The Double (2013)
- Why Don't You Play in Hell? (2013)
- Is the Man Who Is Tall Happy? (2013)
- Get a Horse! (2013)
- Her (2013)
- Spring Breakers (2013)
- This Is the End (2013)
- Man of Steel (2013)
- Only God Forgives (2013)
- CENTER JENNY (2013)
- Coherence (2013)
- Shirley: Visions of Reality (2013)
- Only Lovers Left Alive (2013)
- Frozen (2013)
- Harmony Lessons (2013)
- Nymphomaniac (2013)
- Blue Is the Warmest Colour (2013)
- World War Z (2013)
- Birdman (2014)
- Honeymoon (2014)
- Gone Girl (2014)
- Boyhood (2014)
- Clouds of Sils Maria (2014)
- 22 Jump Street (2014)
- Goodbye to Language (2014)
- Reality (2014)
- The Lego Movie (2014)
- The Look of Silence (2014)
- Inherent Vice (2014)
- The Grand Budapest Hotel (2014)
- Zombeavers (2014)
- Lucy (2014)
- Too Many Cooks (2014)
- What We Do in the Shadows (2014)
- Sunstroke (2014)
- It Follows (2014)
- Love and... (2015)
- The Land of Oz (2015)
- Taxi (2015)
- Cemetery of Splendour (2015)
- World of Tomorrow (2015)
- Frankofonia (2015)
- The Final Girls (2015)
- Cosmos (2015)
- Look Who's Back (2015)
- Zoom (2015)
- Hardcore Henry (2015)
- Arabian Nights (2015)
- Deadpool (2016)
- Antiporno (2016)
- Snowden (2016)
- La La Land (2016)
- Colossal (2016)
- Swiss Army Man (2016)
- The Wandering Soap Opera (2017)
- Get Out (2017)
- I, Tonya (2017)
- The Square (2017)
- You Were Never Really Here (2017)
- One Cut of the Dead (2017)
- Three Billboards Outside Ebbing, Missouri (2017)
- Wonderstruck (2017)
- Baby Driver (2017)
- Under the Silver Lake (2018)
- Spider-Verse (2018–present)
- Lake Michigan Monster (2018)
- Sorry to Bother You (2018)
- Ready Player One (2018)
- You Might Be the Killer (2018)
- Russian Demon (2018)
- The House That Jack Built (2018)
- Black Mirror: Bandersnatch (2018)
- Leto (2018)
- In Fabric (2018)
- The Other Side of the Wind (2018)
- London Fields (2018)
- Long Day's Journey into Night (2018)
- Bad Times at the El Royale (2018)
- Storm (2019)
- Us (2019)
- Joker (2019)
- Midsommar (2019)
- Labyrinth of Cinema (2019)
- Jay and Silent Bob Reboot (2019)
- Knives Out (2019)
- Pain & Glory (2019)
- The Dead Don't Die (2019)
- Once Upon a Time in Hollywood (2019)
- A Frenchman (2019)
- Jojo Rabbit (2019)
- The Nose or the Conspiracy of Mavericks (2020)
- Spree (2020)
- I'm Thinking of Ending Things (2020)
- An Ostrich Told Me the World Is Fake and I Think I Believe It (2021)
- Last Night in Soho (2021)
- Bad Luck Banging or Loony Porn (2021)
- Belle (2021)
- Bergman Island (2021)
- Bo Burnham: Inside (2021)
- The French Dispatch (2021)
- Dune (2021)
- Don't Look Up (2021)
- Aftersun (2022)
- Babylon (2022)
- The Banshees of Inisherin (2022)
- Everything Everywhere All At Once (2022)
- Hundreds of Beavers (2022)
- Nope (2022)
- Razzennest (2022)
- Tár (2022)
- White Noise (2022)
- No Bears (2022)
- Bullet Train (2022)
- Bardo, False Chronicle of a Handful of Truths (2022)
- X film series (2022–2024)
- Barbie (2023)
- Asteroid City (2023)
- Infinity Pool (2023)
- Do Not Expect Too Much from the End of the World (2023)
- Beau is Afraid (2023)
- Poor Things (2023)
- Late Night with the Devil (2023)
- The Sweet East (2023)
- Daaaaaalí! (2023)
- All We Imagine as Light (2024)
- The Brutalist (2024)
- Caught by the Tides (2024)
- A Different Man (2024)
- Joker: Folie à Deux (2024)
- The Master and Margarita (2024)
- Longlegs (2024)
- I Saw the TV Glow (2024)
- Megalopolis (2024)
- Love Lies Bleeding (2024)
- The Most Precious of Cargoes (2024)
- The Substance (2024)
- Weapons (2025)
- Good Boy (2025)
- Dracula (2025)
- Eddington (2025)
- Sinners (2025)
- Good Luck, Have Fun, Don't Die (2025)
- Black Rabbit, White Rabbit (2025)
- I Want Your Sex (2026)
- The Moment (2026)
- The Drama (2026)
- Backrooms (2026)
- The Bride! (2026)
- Buddy (2026)
- Wuthering Heights (2026)
- Her Private Hell (2026)
- Teenage Sex and Death at Camp Miasma (2026)
- Digger (2026)
- You Can See Everything (2026)

== Postmodern documentary and essay film ==
Postmodernist techniques have also influenced non-fiction cinema. For example, Errol Morris’s The Thin Blue Line (1988) is often regarded as the first postmodern documentary due to its ironic use of stylized re-enactments that detach the viewer from any pretense of objective truth. Such works demonstrate that even documentary film can embrace subjectivity, self-reference, and genre-blending in a postmodern way.

== List of notable postmodernist filmmakers ==
- Roger Corman
- Woody Allen
- Pedro Almodovar
- Robert Altman
- Paul Thomas Anderson
- Dario Argento
- Kenneth Anger
- Timur Bekmambetov
- Tex Avery
- Yavuz Turgul
- Aleksei Balabanov
- Peter Bogdanovich
- Emir Baigazin
- Mel Brooks
- Tim Burton
- Sergei Parajanov
- Damien Chazelle
- Sylvain Chomet
- Joel and Ethan Coen
- Bruce Conner
- Sofia Coppola
- Wes Craven
- David Cronenberg
- Georgiy Daneliya
- Joe Dante
- Brian De Palma
- Federico Fellini
- Alexander Tatarsky
- Hans-Jürgen Syberberg
- Abel Ferrara
- David Fincher
- Leonid Gaidai
- Jean-Luc Godard
- Michel Gondry
- Igor Kovalyov
- Peter Greenaway
- Michael Haneke
- Don Hertzfeldt
- Marcell Jankovics
- Andrey Zvyagintsev
- Ralph Bakshi
- Derek Jarman
- Jim Jarmusch
- Spike Jonze
- Priit Pärn
- Radu Jude
- Stephen and Timothy Quay
- Casper Kelly
- Ivan Maximov
- Alejandro González Iñárritu
- Abbas Kiarostami
- Krzysztof Kieślowski
- Grigory Konstantinopolsky
- Harmony Korine
- Alexander Sokurov
- Stanley Kubrick
- Onur Ünlü
- Emir Kusturica
- Jan Švankmajer
- Sam Raimi
- Sergio Leone
- Nikita Mikhalkov
- Xie Jin
- David Lynch
- Piotr Kamler
- Rainer Werner Fassbinder
- Guy Maddin
- Peter Jackson
- Michael Mann
- Adam McKay
- Steve McQueen
- Russ Meyer
- Hayao Miyazaki
- Michael Moore
- Errol Morris
- Kira Muratova
- Ilya Naishuller
- Christopher Nolan
- Nick Park
- Pier Paolo Pasolini
- Raúl Ruiz
- Jordan Peele
- Satoshi Kon
- Maksim Pezhemsky
- George A. Romero
- Ken Russell
- Martin Scorsese
- Ridley Scott
- Charlie Kaufman
- Vasily Sigarev
- Douglas Sirk
- Kevin Smith
- Steven Soderbergh
- Sergei Soloviev
- Steven Spielberg
- Matthew Barney
- Kirill Serebrennikov
- Oliver Stone
- Quentin Tarantino
- Lars von Trier
- Gus van Sant
- Takeshi Kitano
- Paul Verhoeven
- Pavel Lungin
- Lana and Lilly Wachowski
- Taika Waititi
- John Waters
- Michael Winterbottom
- Wong Kar-Wai
- Ed Wood
- Edgar Wright

== Postmodernist television ==
Postmodern television is a category or period of modern television related to the art and philosophy of postmodernism, often making use of postmodern principles such as satire, irony, and deconstruction.

=== List of postmodernist television shows ===
- 30 Rock
- American Horror Story
- Arrested Development
- The Bachelor
- Beverly Hills 90210
- Bob's Burgers
- Borgen
- Breaking Bad
- The Bridge
- The Bullwinkle Show
- Catfish
- The Colbert Report
- Community
- Curb Your Enthusiasm
- Danger Mouse
- Don't Hug Me I'm Scared
- Ed, Edd n Eddy
- Entourage
- Euphoria
- Fallout
- Family Guy
- Futurama
- Fleabag
- Freakazoid!
- Friends
- The Amazing World of Gumball
- Girls
- Hell on Wheels
- Home Improvement
- Inventing Anna
- Dekalog
- It's Always Sunny in Philadelphia
- It's Garry Shandling Show
- KikoRiki
- The Killing
- King of the Hill
- Beavis and Butt-Head
- The Larry Sanders Show
- Louie
- Look Out! Modern!
- Magpie Murders
- Mary Hartman, Mary Hartman
- Masyanya
- Miami Vice
- Mighty Mouse: The New Adventures
- Monty Python's Flying Circus
- Mussolini: Son of the Century
- Mystery Science Theater 3000
- Neon Genesis Evangelion
- The Office
- Parks and Recreation
- Pee Wee's Playhouse
- Portlandia
- The Prisoner
- Real Housewives
- The Rehearsal
- The Ren & Stimpy Show
- Rick and Morty
- Riverdale
- RuPaul's Drag Race
- Saturday Night Live
- The Flowers of Evil
- Scrubs
- Seinfeld
- The Simpsons
- The Singing Detective
- The Sopranos
- South Park
- Space Ghost: Coast to Coast
- Spartacus
- SpongeBob SquarePants
- Stranger Things
- Seventeen Moments of Spring
- True Detective
- The Twilight Zone
- Smiling Friends
- Twin Peaks
- Wild Palms
- Vanderpump Rules
- WandaVision
- Westworld
- The Walking Dead
- The X-Files
- Z Nation

== See also ==
- American Eccentric Cinema
- Art film
- Arthouse animation
- Arthouse film
- Arthouse musical
- Auteur theory
- Cinephilia
- Cult film
- Extreme cinema
- Hyperlink cinema
- Independent film
- Maximalist and minimalist cinema
- French New Wave, similar in content
- New Hollywood, similar in content
- Soviet parallel cinema
- Pop culture fiction
- Modernist film
- Art horror
- Comedy horror
- Found footage
- Postmodern horror
- Slasher
- Remix culture
- Remodernist film, one of the many critical stances against postmodernist cinema
- Slow cinema
- Social thriller
- Vulgar auteurism
- Slapstick film
- Parody film
- Arthouse science fiction film
- Avant-garde film
