= NikitA =

Ukrainian music duo

NIKITA
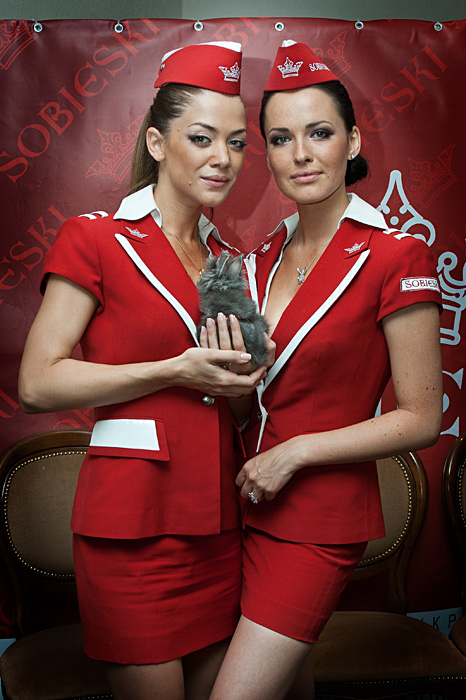
- Ukrainian pop group, NikitA

Background information
- Origin: Ukraine
- Genres: Pop; Dance-pop; Electronic dance music
- Years active: 2008 – 2017
- Labels: mamamusic
- Members: TBA
- Past members: Dasha Astafieva (2008–2017); Yulia Kavtaradze (2008–2011); Anastasiya Kumeyko (2011–2016); Yulia Brychkovska (2012–2016); Antonina Chumak (2016–2017); Alice Trembitskaya (2016–2017)
- Website: http://nikita.fm/

NikitA is a Ukrainian pop duo formed in Ukraine by Yuriy Nikitin.

NikitA is one of the most controversial bands in the Russian speaking world. They are said to be one of the most unusual Ukrainian music bands, as their specified theme of music is "Sexual Aggression".

== Overview ==
The band sings in duet. Nikitin's idea to create the band was under development for quite some time. One of the initial versions of the band's name were Sireny and Divas, however when Nikitin found Dasha and Yulia they decided to name it NikitA which was the name the two ladies used to refer to Nikitin. Nikitin selected Dasha at the Russian-based music project Fabrika Zvezd created by Alla Pugacheva.

Yulia was found by Nikitin a little bit later. Kavtaradze prior to NikitA performed for another band "А.R.М.I.A" (as Army). She left that band being pregnant and after giving birth Yulia tried for Nikitin's music project.

The video director of "Mashyna" was Alexander Filatovich. Choreography for the band was composed by Anastasia Snadna who had prior experience in that field in the "А.Р.М.И.Я" (Kavtaradze's former band). The music director of the band is Roman Babenko who writes lyrics and composes music.

In 2011 the band went through some changes in its cast when Yulia Kavtaradze was replaced with her former colleague from A.R.M.I.A., Anastasia Kumeiko. After that, in 2012, the group added another member Yuliia Brychkovska. Group renamed for "Dasha Astafieva & NIKITA" in 2016.

The trio appeared on the covers of major international men’s magazines in Russia, Ukraine, Germany, Slovenia, South Africa, Poland and other countries.

The group is contracted by the mamamusic music casting company that beside NikitA works with already mentioned "А.Р.М.И.Я" as well as "neAngely" ("НЕАНГЕЛЫ"), Iryna Bilyk, and others.

== Other performances of participants ==
Dasha is also known for being one of the Playboy's playmates in January 2009 (US version). Dasha is a Central Ukraine native, born in the city of Ordzhonikidze. While pursuing a career as a model, Dasha also studied at Dnipropetrovsk Theatrical College.

== Current members ==
- TBA (2017–present) — casting

=== Former members ===
- Dasha Astafieva (2008–2017) — vocal
- Anastasiya Kumeiko (2011–2016) — vocal
- Yulia Kavtaradze (2008–2011) — vocal
- Yuliia Brychkovska (2012–2016) — vocal
- Antonina Chumak (2016–2017) — dancer
- Alice Trembitskaya (2016–2017) — dancer

== Discography ==
=== Albums ===
- 2009 – Mashina (Car)
- 2014 – Hozyain (Owner/ Master)

2009 — «Машина»
No.	Title	Length
1.	"Солдат" (Soldier)	3:38
2.	"Верёвки" (Ropes)	3:32
3.	"Полёт над землёй" (Flying Over Land)	3:14
4.	"Буря в пустыне" (Storm In The Desert)	4:23
5.	"Машина" (Car)	3:34
6.	"Зайчик" (Bunny)	3:20
7.	"Французский поцелуй" (French Kiss)	3:48
8.	"Королева" (Queen)	3:28
9.	"Ветром" (I'll Become Wind)	3:35
10.	"Это чувство" (This Feeling)	3:11

2014 — «Хозяин»
No.	Title	Length
1.	"Хозяин" (Master)	3:39
2.	"Горячий" (Hot)	3:20
3.	"Двигайся" (Move)	3:03
4.	"Делай" (Do)	3:03
5.	"Химия" (Chemistry)	4:10
6.	"Авокадо" (Avocado)	3:01
7.	"Игра" (Game)	3:16
8.	"Гонщик" (Racer)	3:27
9.	"Синее платье" (Blue Dress)	3:21
10.	"Я знаю, это ты" (I Know It's You)	3:40
11.	"Miracle" (feat. Dino & Slick Beats)	4:21

=== Singles ===
1. 2008 - "Mashina" (Car)
2. 2009 - "Zaychik" (Bunny)
3. 2009 - "Veryovki" (Ropes)
4. 2009 - "Soldat" (Soldier)
5. 2010 - "Koroleva" (Queen)
6. 2011 - "Iskusayu" / English version "Bite"
7. 2011 - "20:12" / English version "My Love"
8. 2012 - "Avocado" / in English version too
9. 2013 - "Sineye Plat'e" (Blue Dress)
10. 2013 - "Igra" (Game)
11. 2013 - "Ya Znayu Eto Ty" (I know it's you)
12. 2014 - "Himiya" (Chemistry)
13. 2014 - "Hozyain" (Master)
14. 2014 - "Gonschik" (Racer)
15. 2015 - "Vodopadom" (Falls)
16. 2015 - "Vdykhay" / English version "Breathe in" (2016)
17. 2016 - "Ropes"
18. 2017 - "Nesmelaya" (Timid)

== Videography ==
Year	Title	Director	Artists	Album
2008	«Машина»	Alexander Alexandrovich Filatovich	Dasha Astafieva, Yulia Kavtaradze	«Машина»
2008	«Зайчик»	Alexander Alexandrovich Filatovich	Dasha Astafieva, Yulia Kavtaradze	«Машина»
2009	«Солдат»	Victor Skuratovskiy	Dasha Astafieva, Yulia Kavtaradze	«Машина»
2009	«Верёвки»	Victor Skuratovskiy	Dasha Astafieva, Yulia Kavtaradze	«Машина»
2010	«Королева»	Sergey Tkachenko	Dasha Astafieva, Yulia Kavtaradze	«Машина»
2011	«Искусаю» / «Bite»	Sergey Tkachenko	Dasha Astafieva, Yulia Kavtaradze	«Машина»
2011	«20:12» / «My Love»	Sergey Tkachenko	Dasha Astafieva, Anastasia Kumeyko	No album
2012	«Это чувство»	Valery Bebko, Oleg Borschevskyy	Dasha Astafieva, Yulia Kavtaradze	«Машина»
2013	«Авокадо» / «Avocado»	Sergey Tkachenko	Dasha Astafieva, Anastasia Kumeyko, Yuliia Brychkovska	«Хозяин»
2013	«Синее платье»	Alexander Shapiro	Dasha Astafieva, Anastasia Kumeyko, Yuliia Brychkovska	«Хозяин»
2013	«Игра» / «Johnny Go!»	Oleg Borschevskyy	Dasha Astafieva, Anastasia Kumeyko, Yuliia Brychkovska	«Хозяин»
2014	«Химия» (Rehearsal video)	Taras Vorobets	Dasha Astafieva, Anastasia Kumeyko, Yuliia Brychkovska	«Хозяин»
2014	«Гонщик» (Concert video)	Taras Vorobets	Dasha Astafieva, Anastasia Kumeyko, Yuliia Brychkovska	«Хозяин»
2014	«Хозяин»	Sergey Tkachenko	Dasha Astafieva, Anastasia Kumeyko, Yuliia Brychkovska	«Хозяин»
2015	«Водопадом»	Taras Vorobets	Dasha Astafieva, Anastasia Kumeyko, Yuliia Brychkovska	«Водопадом» (Single)
2015	«Делай» (Reality video)	Taras Vorobets	Dasha Astafieva, Anastasia Kumeyko, Yuliia Brychkovska	«Хозяин»
2015	«Вдыхай» / «Breathe In»	Anna Gurban, Taras Vorobets	Dasha Astafieva, Anastasia Kumeyko, Yuliia Brychkovska	«Вдыхай» / «Breathe In» (single)
2017	«Несмелая»	Alan Badoev	Dasha Astafieva	«Несмелая» (single)
