= Ševela =

Ševela is a Slovak surname. Notable people with the surname include:

- Efraim Sevela (1928–2010), Russian writer
- Martin Ševela (born 1975), Slovak footballer and manager
