= Grigory Konstantinopolsky =

Russian actor, director, producer and artist (born 1964)

- Born: January 29, 1964; Moscow, Russian SFSR, USSR
- Occupations: Film director, screenwriter, actor, film producer, composer, artist
- Awards: Kinotavr (2018)

Grigory Mikhailovich Konstantinopolsky (born January 29, 1964, Moscow) is a Russian film actor, film director, screenwriter, film producer, composer and artist.

== Biography ==
Grigory Konstantinopolsky was born on 29 January 1964 in Moscow in a family of teachers. In 1985, he graduated from the Yaroslavl Theater Institute (workshop of V. S. Nelsky, department – dramatic theatre and film actor).

In 1990, he graduated from the Higher Courses for Scriptwriters and Directors at Goskino USSR (workshop of R. A. Bykov, department – feature film directing).

Since 1992, he has worked in advertising and show business, directing numerous music videos, including: "Vovochka" (Pep-See), "Mal-pomalu" (Alla Pugacheva), "Buratino", "Shire shag!" (Time-out), and many others. He directed over 300 music videos.

In 1996, he recorded the album "Matilda and Vampires" as a composer and performer (with Moralny Kodeks and Neprikasaemye).

In 1999, he shot his debut feature film 8 ½ $. Magazine Afisha included the film on its list of "100 main Russian films of 1992–2013".

In 2001, he directed the short film Hypnosis for REN TV.

In 2008, he completed the feature film Visiting $kazki (Amedia), though post-production was halted by the studio's management.

In 2009, he directed Kitty, serving also as screenwriter and producer.

In 2011, he directed Samka, acting as director, screenwriter, producer, production designer, and composer.

In 2016, he directed the four-episode television film Drunk Firm, produced by the TV channel TNT. The series received the award for "Best Television Film / Series" and a nomination for "Best Screenwriting" from the Association of Film and Television Producers of Russia.

In 2018, he directed the feature film Russian Demon.

In 2019, he directed the feature film Storm, based on the play of the same name by Alexander Ostrovsky.

In November 2022, the film Clipmakers was selected as one of ten Russian films included in the main competition program of the first auteur-cinema festival "Zimniy".

== Filmography ==
Year	Film	Director	Writer	Producer	Actor	Role	
Year	Film	1985	City of Brides			✓	Shakin
1989	Assuage my sorrow			✓	hippie "General"		
1988	Red Elephants	✓	✓				
1991	Stars at Tudor-street			✓	portrait on the wall		
1991	Star of the Microdistrict		✓				
1991	Anna Karamazoff			✓			
1992	Dyuba-Dyuba			✓	Viktor		
1999	8 ½ $	✓	✓		✓	cameo	
2000	Black Room (segment "Hypnosis")	✓	✓				
2000	Right to Choose			✓	Grigory		
2001	Hypnosis (short)	✓	✓				
2006	Tumbler toy		✓				
2009	Kitty	✓	✓	✓	✓	Bol	
2010	Samka	✓	✓	✓	✓	hunter	
2016	Drunk Firm	✓	✓		✓	Seleznyov	
2018	Russian Demon	✓	✓	✓	✓	"Black Man"	
2018	Russian Brief. Issue 1	✓	✓	✓	✓	photographer	
2019	Storm	✓	✓				
2020	Dead Souls	✓			✓	Boris Grebenshchikov, musician	
2022	Clipmakers	✓	✓				

== Composer ==
- 2011 — Samka
- 2016 — The Drunk Firm
- 2017 — Olesya (short)
- 2019 — The Storm

== Production designer ==
- 2011 — Samka

== Festivals and awards ==
- 1991 — Participation in the 41st Berlin International Film Festival (Panorama section; film Star of the Microdistrict).
- 1996 — Grand Prix of the advertising and music-video festival "Pokoleniye-96" for the music video "Vovochka" of the group Pep-See.
- 1999 — National film award Golden Aries in the category "Debut of the Year" (film 8 ½ $).
- 1999 — National film award White Elephant in the category "Best Directorial Debut" (film 8 ½ $).
- 2009 — Closing film of the Kinotavr Film Festival (film Kitty).
