= Dasha Astafieva =

Ukrainian model (born 1985)

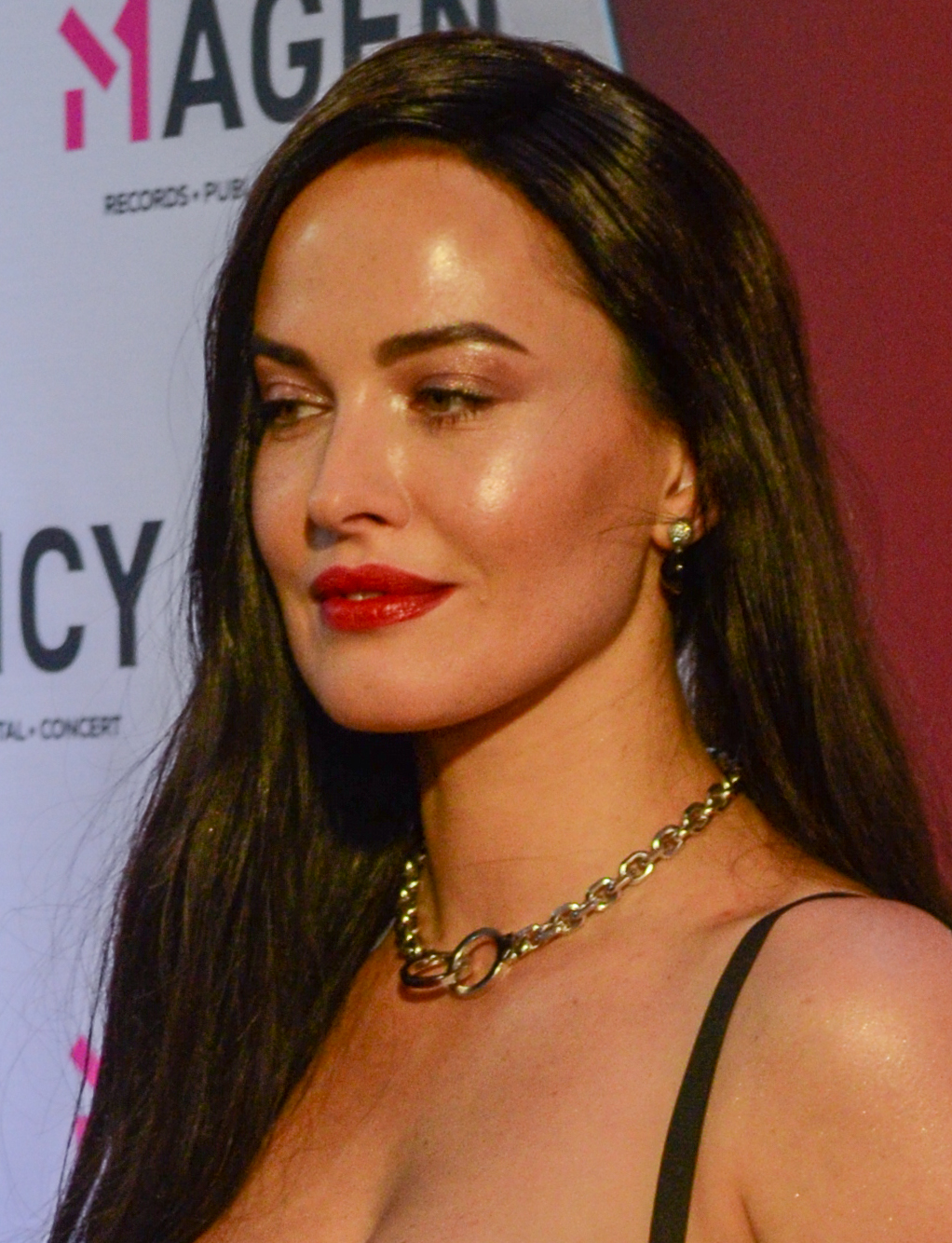
- Dasha Astafieva at the M1 Music Awards 2019
- Born: Daria Dasha Viktorvina Astafieva; August 4, 1985 (age 41); Ordzhonikidze, Ukrainian SSR, Soviet Union (now Pokrov, Ukraine)
- Occupations: Celebrity, model, singer
Height
173 cm
Playboy centerfold appearance
- January 2009
- Preceded by: Jennifer and Natalie Jo Campbell
- Succeeded by: Jessica Burciaga

Daria "Dasha" Viktorivna Astafieva (Ukrainian: Дар'я Вікторівна Астаф’єва; born 4 August 1985) is a Ukrainian model, singer, and actress. Formerly of the Ukrainian pop duo NikitA, Dasha Astafieva was the 2007 Playmate of the Year for Ukrainian Playboy and the 55th Anniversary Playmate for American Playboy.

== Early life ==
Dasha Astafieva was born in Pokrov, Ukraine in 1985. When she was a little girl, Astafieva found a copy of Playboy in a closet at her family's house. Katarina Witt was on the cover. "I was in shock because I didn’t understand how beautiful a woman’s body could be. That day, I said to myself I wanted to pose one day in the magazine," she said in a 2008 interview with AskMen, "I was 9 years old."

== Career ==
Dasha Astafieva started to pursue a career in modeling in 2003. In 2008, Dasha Astafieva became a founding member of the Ukrainian pop music duo, NikitA. In 2007, she was named Playmate of the Year for Ukrainian Playboy. Two years later, in January 2009, Dasha Astafieva was American Playboy's Playmate of the Month. She was the 55th Anniversary Playmate, the search and selection of which were featured on episodes of The Girls Next Door. During that time, Dasha Astafieva lived at the Playboy Mansion. When Hugh Hefner told her that she was the Anniversary Playmate, Dasha Astafieva cried. In 2011, Dasha Astafieva was named spokesperson for AnastasiaDate, a dating site. In 2017, Dasha Astafieva left NikitA. She releases new music regularly and performs live in Ukraine.

In 2026, Ukrainian President Volodymyr Zelensky presented the Order of Princess Olga, Third Class, Astafieva at the Kyiv-Pechersk Lavra monastery.

== Personal life ==
Dasha Astafieva fasts once a week. She has studied Muay Thai and theater.

After February 24, 2022, the celebrity participated in the GIDNA project from Future for Ukraine Charity Foundation.

Dasha Astafieva	Jessica Burciaga	Jennifer Pershing	Hope Dworaczyk	Crystal McCahill	Candice Cassidy
Karissa Shannon	Kristina Shannon	Kimberly Phillips	Lindsey Gayle Evans	Kelley Thompson	Crystal Harris
