= Clipmakers =

- Film poster
- Directed by: Grigory Konstantinopolsky (ru)
- Written by: Grigory Konstantinopolsky
- Produced by: Sergey Selyanov (ru); Irina Bark; Yevgeniya Tsitsina; Ekaterina Dzhagarova
- Starring: Alexander Gorchilin; Aleksandr Kuznetsov; Mariya Shalayeva; Vladimir Epifantsev; Roza Khayrullina; Kristina Vedeneyeva; Aram Vardevanyan
- Cinematography: Dmitry Shebunin
- Edited by: Oleg Sakharov; Dmitry Oryol; Maksim Smirnov
- Music by: Aleksandr Sokolov
- Production company: CTB Film Company
- Distributed by: Cinema Atmosphere
- Release date: January 5, 2023
- Running time: 110 minutes
- Country: Russia
- Language: Russian
- Box office: ₽11 million

Clipmakers (Russian: Клипмейкеры, romanized: Klipmeykery) is a 2023 Russian comedy film written and directed by Grigory Konstantinopolsky with biopic elements.

The cast of the film in the lead roles is represented by Alexander Gorchilin, Aleksandr Kuznetsov, Mariya Shalayeva and our other artists. The film takes place in the nineties. The film tells about young music video makers who always have some kind of adventure and it seems to them that everything is still ahead.

It is scheduled to be theatrically released on January 5, 2023, by Cinema Atmosphere.

== Plot ==
The action of the picture takes place in the dashing 1990s - with their powerful and at the same time spontaneous business development, glamorous parties, gang wars, often turning into a bloody ending. The production of commercials and music videos is becoming one of the most profitable financial investments. The protagonist of the film, a young ambitious Moscow music video director Grisha, is just starting his journey in this new profession for Russian society. For the successful development of his career, he needs useful connections, therefore, in his environment there are only the highest paid video makers in the country, and among his clients are the most popular domestic artists. Gregory is trying his luck, getting involved from time to time in dangerous adventures. But it's worth it: after all, as they say, who does not take risks does not drink champagne!

== Cast ==
- Alexander Gorchilin as Grigory "Grisha" Vizantysky
- Aleksandr Kuznetsov as Vasily "Vasya" Coppola
- Ekaterina Balandina as Vasya's girlfriend
- Mariya Shalayeva as Tonya Vodkina
- Vladimir Epifantsev as a bandit, deputy assistant Bober
- Kristina Vedeneyeva as Gelya
- Aram Vardevanyan as Armen Petrosyan
- Roza Khayrullina as Armen's grandmother
- Tatyana Struzhenkova as Laura
- Daniil Gazizullin as Okhlostanov
- Ivan Murashev as Ganya
- Daria Kulida as Kristina Orbakaite
- Nikolai Fomenko as Boris Berezovsky
- Aleksandr Molochnikov as Yelisey
- Rinal Mukhametov as Bogdan Titomir
- Stepan Devonin as Bilivnev
- Igor Vernik as himself
- Dmitry Grinevich as Yuri Lyubshin, cameraman
- Stasya Venkova as Nastya
- Alisa Tarasenko as Lika Star
- Nikita Presnyakov as Vladimir Presnyakov Jr.
- Vyacheslav Razbegaev as Gelya's boyfriend

== Production ==
The director of this comedy from CTB was Grigory Konstantinopolsky according to his own script. And the producers of the humorous Russian project include Sergey Selyanov, Irina Bark, Evgeniya Tsitsina. Cinematographer Dmitrii Shebunin is responsible for the visual component, and composer Aleksandr Sokolov is responsible for the musical accompaniment.

Some characters are bred under their own names: Aram Vardevanyan plays Armen Petrosyan, Rinal Mukhametov plays Bogdan Titomir, Nikita Presnyakov plays Vladimir Presnyakov Jr.'s own father. Others only resemble real clip makers and representatives of creative bohemia: for example, the hero of Aleksandr Kuznetsov plays Vasily Coppola (son of the famous director Grigory Coppola), is somewhat similar to Fyodor Bondarchuk, Tonya Vodkina (Mariya Shalayeva) to Dunya Smirnova, Armen's elderly grandmother (Roza Khayrullina) on Mrs. Bronya, and the artist Okhlostanov, the star of the film Eight and a Half Dollars on Ivan Okhlobystin, who really played the main role in the film of the same name. The main character (Alexander Gorchilin), bred under the transparent pseudonym Grisha Vizantysky, is the alter ego of Grigory Konstantinopolsky himself.

== Release ==
The premiere date in Russia should take place in cinemas around the country from January 5, 2023. The distributor of the comedy picture on the territory of the Russian Federation is the company "Cinema Atmosphere".
