= American Airlines Flight 587 =

2001 aviation accident in New York

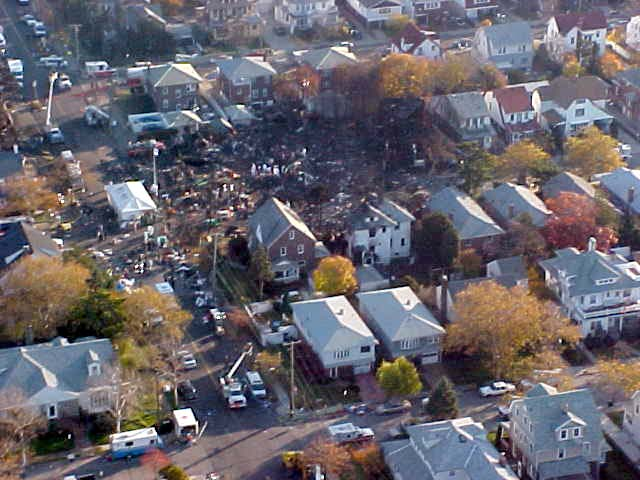
- Overhead view of the wreckage

Accident
- Date: November 12, 2001
- Summary: Loss of control following separation of vertical stabilizer due to excessive rudder inputs resulting in flight breakup
- Site: Belle Harbor, Queens, New York City, U.S.; 40°34′38″N 73°51′2″W
- Total fatalities: 265

Aircraft
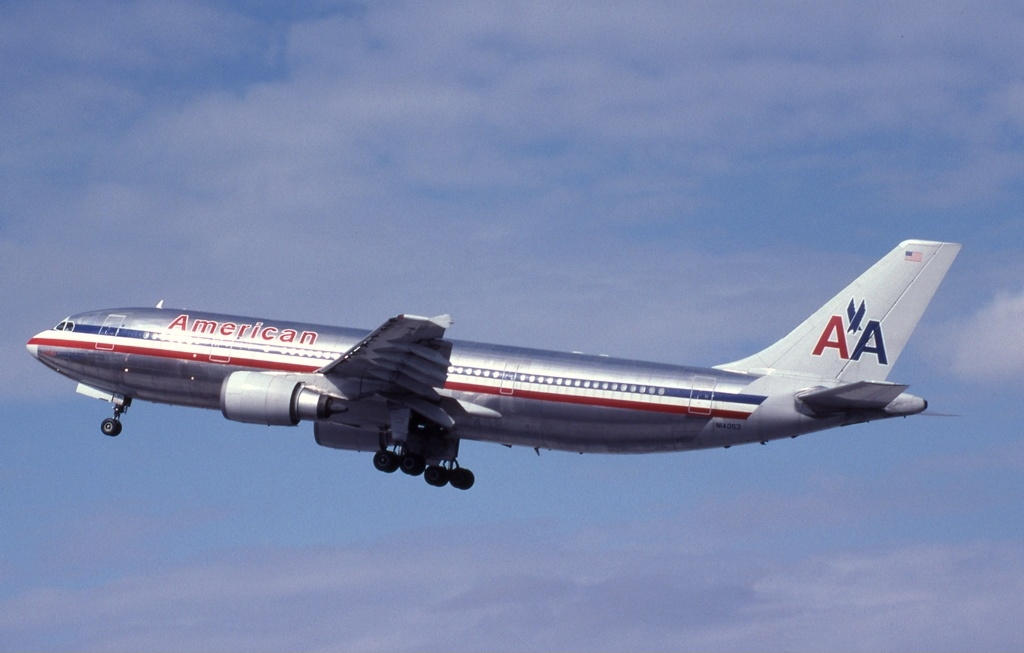
- N14053, the aircraft involved in the accident, pictured in January 2001
- Aircraft type: Airbus A300B4-605R
- Operator: American Airlines
- IATA flight No.: AA587
- ICAO flight No.: AAL587
- Call sign: AMERICAN 587
- Registration: N14053
- Flight origin: John F. Kennedy International Airport, New York City, U.S.
- Destination: Las Américas International Airport, Santo Domingo, Dominican Republic
- Occupants: 260
- Passengers: 251
- Crew: 9
- Fatalities: 260
- Survivors: 0

Ground casualties
- Ground fatalities: 5

American Airlines Flight 587 was a regularly scheduled international passenger flight from John F. Kennedy International Airport, New York City, to Las Américas International Airport, Santo Domingo, Dominican Republic. On November 12, 2001, the Airbus A300 flying the route crashed into the neighborhood of Belle Harbor on the Rockaway Peninsula of Queens, New York City, shortly after takeoff, killing all 251 passengers and nine crew members aboard, as well as five people on the ground. It is the second-deadliest aviation accident (Note: The September 11 attacks, with a greater number of fatalities, were deliberate terrorism.) to have occurred in the United States, behind the crash of American Airlines Flight 191 in 1979, and the second-deadliest aviation incident involving any Airbus aircraft, after Iran Air Flight 655.

The location of the accident, and that it took place only two months after the September 11 attacks on the World Trade Center in nearby Manhattan, initially spawned fears of another terrorist attack, but the National Transportation Safety Board (NTSB) attributed the disaster to the first officer's overuse of rudder controls in response to wake turbulence from a preceding Japan Airlines Boeing 747-400 that took off minutes before it. According to the NTSB, the aggressive use of the rudder controls by the first officer, the result of a flawed training scenario that exaggerated the effects of wake turbulence, stressed the vertical stabilizer until it was ripped from the aircraft. The airliner's two engines also separated from the aircraft before impact due to the intense forces.

== Aircraft and crew ==
The accident aircraft, registration N14053, was an Airbus A300 B4-605R delivered new to American Airlines on July 12, 1988. The aircraft's first flight was on December 9, 1987, and it was the first "R" model A300-600 built. On the day of the accident, it was in a two-class seating configuration with space for 251 passengers, and all 16 business-class seats and 235 economy-class seats were occupied. The aircraft was powered by two General Electric CF6-80C2A5 engines. On board were nine crew members, including 42-year-old Captain Edward States, (Note: Captain States had been a former U.S. Air Force pilot and joined American Airlines in 1985. He became a first officer on the Airbus A300 in 1988 and was promoted to an A300 captain 10 years later. States had 8,050 flight hours, including 3,448 hours on the Airbus A300.) who was the pilot monitoring and undertaking radio communications, and 34-year-old First Officer Sten Molin, who was the pilot flying. (Note: First Officer Molin had previously flown commuter and general aircraft prior to joining American Airlines in 1991. He became an Airbus A300 first officer in 1998 and had 4,403 flight hours, with 1,835 of them on the Airbus A300.)

== Accident ==
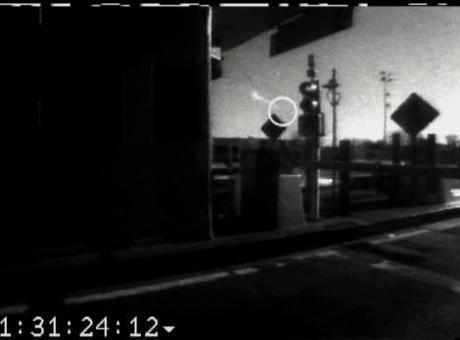
Flight 587, circled in white, moving downward with a white streak behind the aircraft at 9:16:06, from a video of a toll-booth camera on the Marine Parkway–Gil Hodges Memorial Bridge

External videos
- CCTV on YouTube

The aircraft taxied to Runway 31L behind a Japan Airlines (JAL) Boeing 747-400 (JAL Flight 47) preparing for takeoff. The JAL flight was cleared for takeoff at 9:11:08 am EST. At 9:11:36, the tower controller cautioned Flight 587 about potential wake turbulence from a preceding 747.

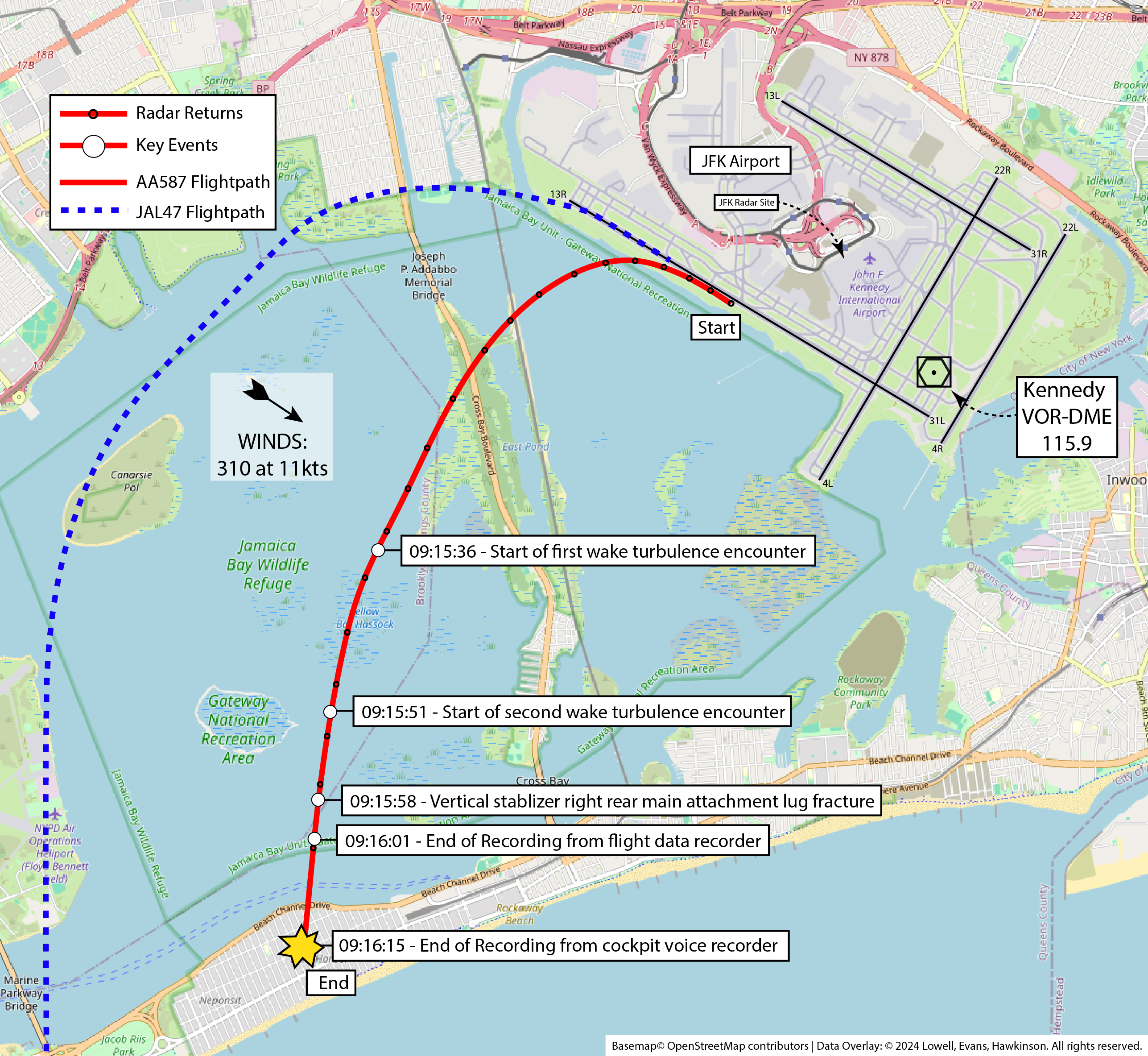
Flight path Information

At 9:13:28, the A300 was cleared for takeoff and left the runway at 9:14:29, about one minute and 40 seconds after the JAL flight had departed. The aircraft climbed to an altitude of 500 feet (150 m) and then entered a climbing left turn to a heading of 220°. At 9:15:00, the captain made initial contact with the departure controller, informing him that the airplane was at 1,300 ft (400 m) and climbing to 5,000 ft (1,500 m). The controller instructed the aircraft to climb to and maintain 13,000 ft (4,000 m). The flight data recorder (FDR) showed that the events leading to the crash began when the aircraft hit wake turbulence from the JAL flight in front of it at 9:15:36. In response to the turbulence, Molin moved the rudder from the right to the left and back again in quick succession from 9:15:52, causing sideslip until the lateral force caused composite lugs that attached the vertical stabilizer to fail at 9:15:58. The stabilizer separated from the aircraft and fell into Jamaica Bay, about 1 mi (1.6 km) north of the main wreckage site.

The aircraft pitched downward after the stabilizer loss. As the pilots struggled to control the aircraft, it entered a flat spin. The resulting aerodynamic loads sheared both engines from the aircraft, and they fell several blocks north and east of the main wreckage site, causing minor damage to a gas station and major damage to a home and a boat. The loss of engines cut power to the FDR at 9:16:01, while the cockpit voice recorder (CVR), using an emergency bus, stopped at 9:16:14.8 upon impact with the ground. At 9:16:04, the stall warning sounded on the CVR. The last recorded words were those of Molin saying, "What the hell are we into, we're stuck in it" (9:16:07) and States replying, "Get out of it, get out of it." The aircraft slammed into the ground at Newport Avenue and Beach 131st Street.

== Investigation ==
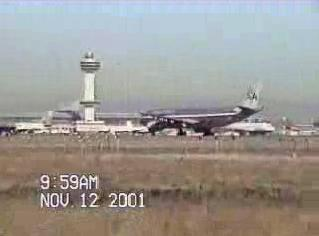
The accident aircraft on runway 31L at 8:59 am, moments before takeoff: The timestamp shown in the picture is displayed in daylight saving time, which is not observed in November.

=== Initial reactions and investigation ===
Because the crash occurred just two months after the September 11 attacks, which also took place in New York City, several major buildings, including the Empire State Building and the headquarters of the United Nations, were evacuated. The Port Authority of New York and New Jersey closed all bridges and tunnels between Manhattan and New Jersey and suspended PATH service for a few hours; traffic was disrupted, but the level was less than a typical Monday because it was Veterans Day. The New York metropolitan area's three major airports – JFK, LaGuardia, and Newark – remained closed for much of the day, leading to the cancellation of many flights. Air National Guard fighter jets patrolled U.S. airspace after the crash.

Rumors circulated that the plane had been destroyed in a terrorist plot. In May 2002, a Kuwaiti national named Mohammed Jabarah agreed to cooperate with investigators as part of a plea bargain. Among the details that Jabarah offered to authorities was a claim that Khalid Sheikh Mohammed's lieutenant had told him that Richard Reid and Abderraouf Jdey had been enlisted by al Qaeda to execute identical shoe-bombing plots as part of a second wave of attacks against the United States. According to the lieutenant, Jdey's bomb had successfully destroyed Flight 587, while Reid's attempt had been foiled. According to a Canadian government memorandum, Jdey, a naturalized Canadian citizen, was to use his Canadian passport to board the flight, but American Airlines' passenger manifest for Flight 587 did not list any passengers using Canadian passports. According to NTSB spokesman Ted Lopatkiewicz, the weight of the memo's veracity was questioned, as no evidence of a terrorist traveling on board was found. The evidence suggested that the aircraft was destroyed after a piece of the tail assembly, "the vertical fin, came off", while it did not indicate "any kind of event in the cabin."

=== NTSB investigation ===
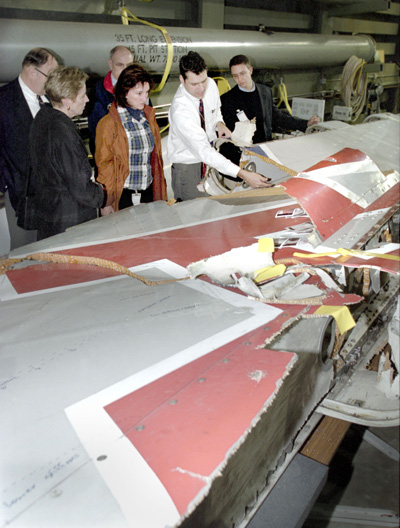
NTSB employee Brian Murphy (second from right) updates NTSB chairman Marion Blakey (third from right) on the investigation of the tail fin and rudder from AA flight 587 (February 11, 2002).

On the afternoon of the crash, the NTSB launched an investigation in search for a probable cause. Over the next three months, they conducted 349 interviews and collected and reconstructed pieces of the aircraft. The Airbus A300 took off shortly after a JAL Boeing 747-400 using the same runway. It flew into the larger jet's wake, an area of turbulent air. The first officer attempted to stabilize the aircraft with alternating aggressive rudder inputs. The force of the air flowing against the moving rudder stressed the aircraft's vertical stabilizer, and eventually snapped it off entirely, causing the aircraft to lose control and crash. The NTSB concluded that the enormous stress on the vertical stabilizer was due to the first officer's "unnecessary and excessive" rudder inputs, and not the wake turbulence caused by the 747. The NTSB further stated, "if the first officer had stopped making additional inputs, the aircraft would have stabilized". Contributing factors were characteristics of the Airbus A300-600's sensitive rudder system design and elements of the American Airlines Advanced Aircraft Maneuvering Training Program.

The manner in which the vertical stabilizer separated concerned investigators. It is connected to the fuselage with six attaching points. Each point has two sets of attachment lugs, one set made of composite material, another of aluminum, all connected by a titanium bolt; damage analysis showed that the bolts and aluminum lugs were intact, but not the composite lugs. This, coupled with two events earlier in the life of the aircraft, namely delamination in part of the vertical stabilizer prior to its delivery from Airbus's Toulouse factory, and an encounter with heavy turbulence in 1994, caused investigators to examine the use of composites. The possibility that the composite materials might not be as strong as previously supposed was a cause of concern, as they are used in other areas of the plane, including the engine mounting and the wings. Tests carried out on the vertical stabilizers from the accident aircraft, and from another similar aircraft, found that the strength of the composite material had not been compromised, and the NTSB concluded that the material had failed because it had been stressed beyond its design limit.

The crash was witnessed by hundreds of people, 349 of whom gave accounts of what they saw to the NTSB. About half (52%) reported a fire or explosion before the plane hit the ground. Others stated that they saw a wing detach from the aircraft, when in fact it was the vertical stabilizer.

After the crash, Floyd Bennett Field's empty hangars were used as a makeshift morgue for the identification of crash victims.

==== Findings ====
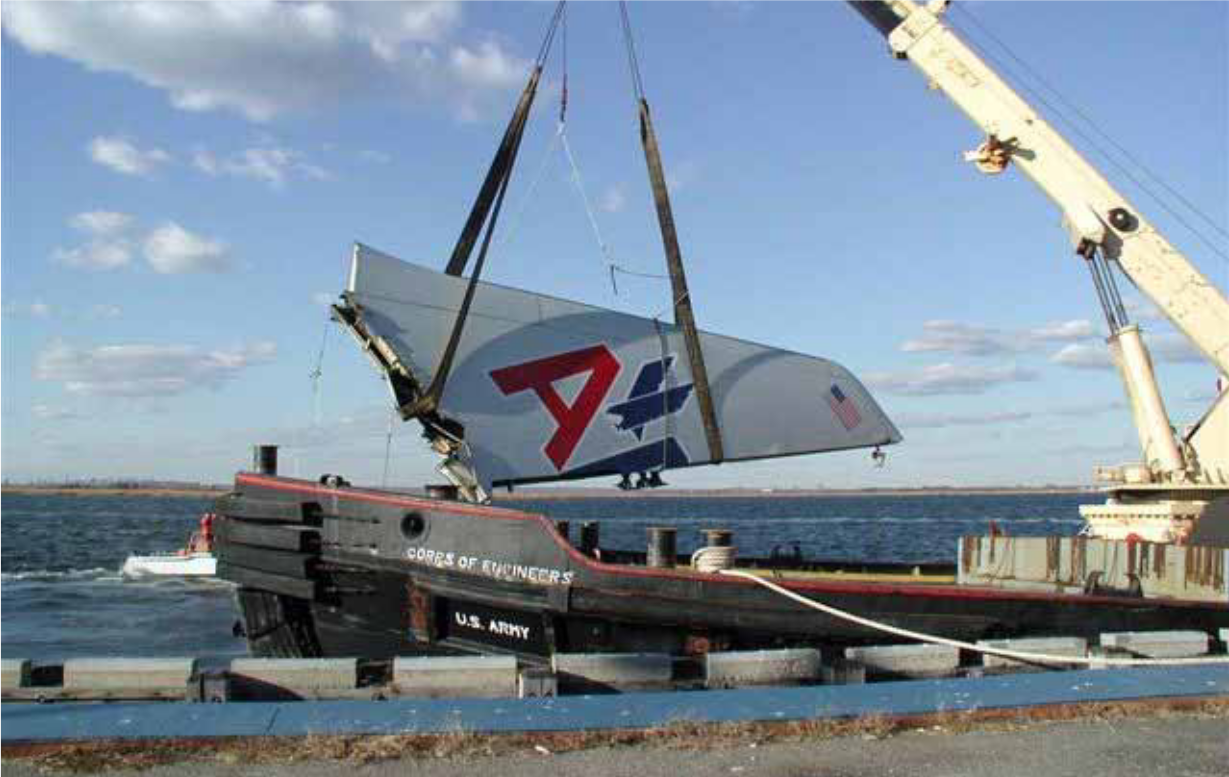
The vertical stabilizer being recovered from Jamaica Bay

According to the official accident report, the first officer repeatedly moved the rudder from fully left to fully right. This caused increasing sideslip angles. The resulting hazardous sideslip angle led to extremely high aerodynamic loads that separated the vertical stabilizer. If the first officer had stopped moving the rudder at any time before the vertical stabilizer failed, the aircraft would have leveled out on its own, and the accident would have been avoided. The aircraft performance study indicated that when the vertical stabilizer finally detached, the aerodynamic loads caused by the first officer's actions produced 203,000 pounds-force (900 kilonewtons) of force on the rudder, meaning that the vertical stabilizer did not fail until far in excess of the 100,000 lbf (440 kN) of force defined by the design envelope. The vertical stabilizer's structural performance was determined to be consistent with design specifications and to have exceeded certification requirements.

Contributing factors identified in the report included: First, the first officer's predisposition to overreact to wake turbulence; second, training provided by American Airlines that could have encouraged pilots to use the rudder aggressively; third, the first officer likely not understanding an airplane's response to full rudder at high airspeeds or the mechanism by which the rudder rolls a transport-category airplane; and finally, light rudder pedal forces and small pedal displacement of the A300-600 rudder pedal system that increased the airplane's susceptibility to rudder misuse.

An animated accident reconstruction shows the control inputs made by the copilot at the 4:00-minute mark.

Most aircraft require increased pressure on the rudder pedals to achieve the same amount of rudder control at a higher speed. The Airbus A300 and later Airbus A310 models do not operate on a fly-by-wire flight control system, but instead use conventional mechanical flight controls. The NTSB asserted that the A300-600 rudder control system was vulnerable to excessive rudder inputs. The Allied Pilots Association, in its submission to the NTSB, argued that the unusual sensitivity of the rudder mechanism amounted to a design flaw that Airbus should have communicated to the airline. The main rationale for their position came from a 1997 report that referenced 10 incidents in which A300 tail fins had been stressed beyond their design limitation.

Airbus charged that the crash was mostly American Airlines' fault, arguing that the airline did not train its pilots properly about the characteristics of the rudder. Aircraft tail fins are designed to withstand full rudder deflection in one direction when below maneuvering speed, but this does not guarantee that they can withstand an abrupt shift in rudder from one direction to the other, let alone multiple abrupt shifts, like those generated by the first officer on this flight. The NTSB indicated that American Airlines' Advanced Aircraft Maneuvering Program (AAMP) tended to exaggerate the effects of wake turbulence on large aircraft, creating a simulation scenario whereby turbulence from a 747 creates a 90° roll (rather than the likely 5 to 10° roll, though not explaining this to the pilots) to maximize the training challenge. Therefore, pilots were being inadvertently trained to react more aggressively than was necessary. According to author Amy Louise Fraher, this led to concerns of whether it was appropriate for the AAMP to be placing such importance on "the role of flight simulators in teaching airplane upset recovery at all." Fraher states that the key to understanding the crash of Flight 587 ultimately lay in "how the accident pilots' expectations about aircraft performance were erroneously established through 'clumsy' flight simulator training in American's AAMP."

==== Statement of probable cause ====
From the NTSB report of the accident:

The National Transportation Safety Board determines that the probable cause of this accident was the in-flight separation of the vertical stabilizer as a result of the loads beyond ultimate design that were created by the first officer's unnecessary and excessive rudder pedal inputs. Contributing to these rudder pedal inputs were characteristics of the Airbus A300-600 rudder system design and elements of the American Airlines Advanced Aircraft Maneuvering Program (AAMP).

Since the NTSB's report, American Airlines has modified its AAMP.

== Victims ==
Victims' nationalities
Nationality	Passengers	Crew	Ground	Total
United States	176	9	5	190
Dominican Republic	68	-	-	68
Republic of China (Taiwan)	3	-	-	3
France (Note: Passenger Sylvie Greleau, identified as British by American Airlines, carried a French passport, as did one additional passenger, Jean Heuze.)	2	-	-	2
Haiti	1	-	-	1
Israel	1	-	-	1
Total	251	9	5	265

All 260 people aboard the plane died in the crash. Five bystanders on the ground were also killed. One of the victims, Hilda Yolanda Mayol, had previously survived the September 11 attacks, having escaped from the North Tower of the World Trade Center. She was traveling to her mother and children, attempting to escape the trauma of the attacks.Another victim of the crash was Ashot Melikjanyan, a Soviet-Armenian former actor, who later became a naturalized American citizen.

Five residents of Belle Harbor were killed in the crash: Thomas (aged 79) and Helen (aged 73) Concannon, an elderly married couple; Franco "Frank" Pomponio (aged 45); and Kathleen Lawler (aged 48) and her son Christopher Lawler (aged 24), a second-year law student at St. John's University, Frank Pomponio's wife, daughter, and dog survived by escaping through the rear of their home, quickly navigating through billowing smoke. Pomponio, however, was directly struck and subsequently trapped while sleeping in the upstairs bedroom. Moments later the family dog reportedly ran back to their house to find Pomponio. She disappeared in the flames but was found hours later in stable condition, albeit with her paws severely damaged. Pomponio also had a son, Michael, who was attending SUNY Albany at the time of the incident. Kathleen Lawler's two daughters, Katelyn and Jennifer, were attending Bishop Kearney High School alongside Frank Pomponio's daughter, Jennifer. Lawler was married to her husband, Thomas Lawler, and had a son, Brendan. Many students at Bishop Kearney had relatives killed in the 9/11 attacks, which had occurred two months prior. As reported by the New York Post, a total of seven individuals linked to Bishop Kearney died in connection with both incidents.

A few months after the incident, Frank Pomponio's wife, Gerry Pomponio, joined with a group of community leaders committed to fighting for reduced airplane traffic over residential areas. She stated in an interview with the Queens Chronicle, "It's sad that the FAA hasn't brought about a change in a timely way." She added, "It's disturbing. They made a claim, and they're not keeping up with their promise." Months prior in a community meeting, FAA officials said they would begin rerouting many departing flights from JFK Airport so that most planes would fly over water and parkland instead of over homes. However, commercial airlines continued to fly over the densely populated neighborhoods of the Rockaway Peninsula. By 2004, three new houses were under construction at the crash site in the southeast corner of B131 St and Newport Avenue.

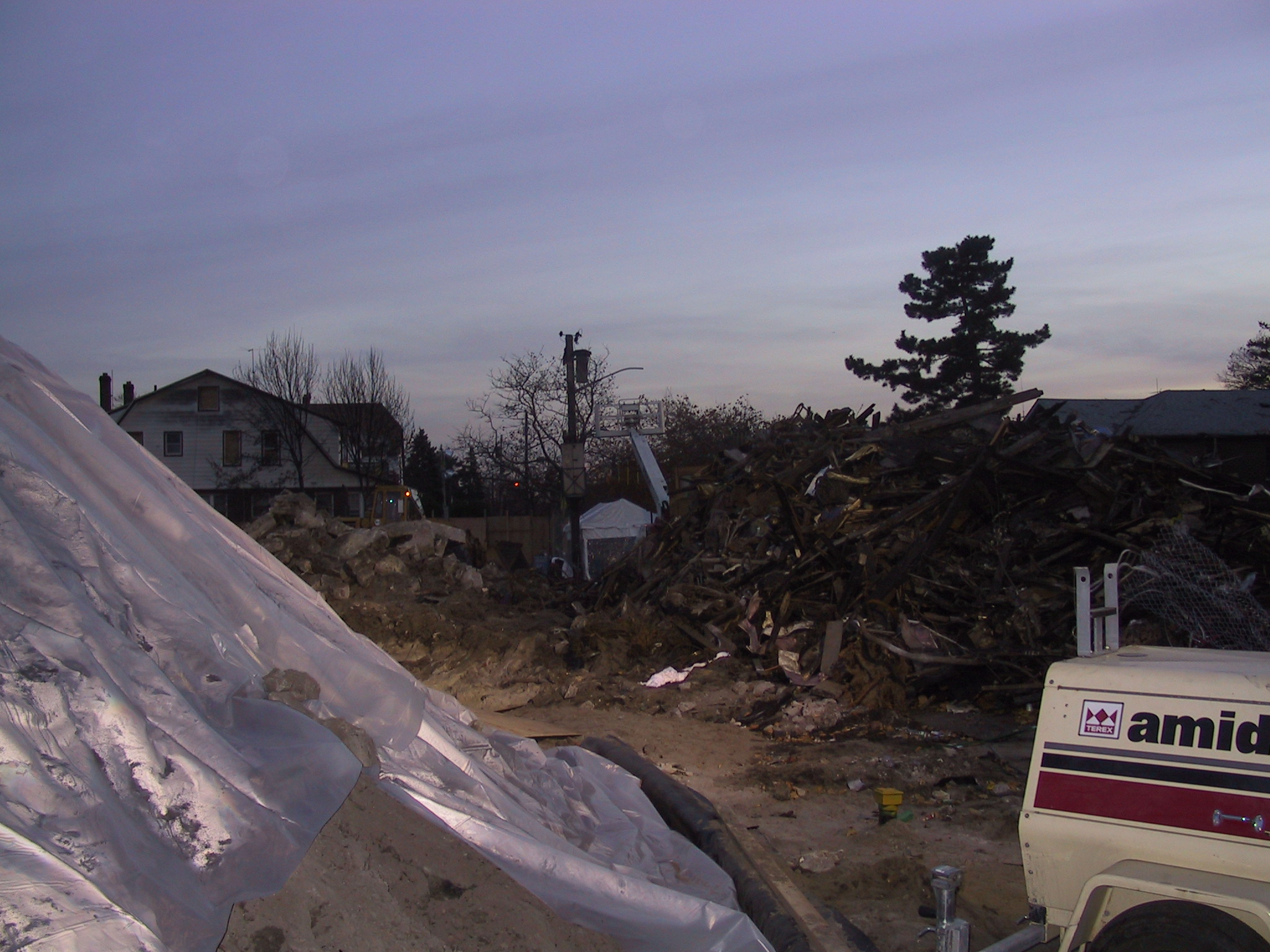
Rubble at the accident site ten days after the crash

Las Américas International Airport officials created a private area for those who had come to the airport to meet passengers, some of whom were unaware that the airliner had crashed. The authorities at JFK used the Ramada Plaza JFK Hotel to house relatives and friends of the victims of the crash. The family crisis center later moved to the Javits Center in Manhattan.

=== Cultural background ===
In 2001, 51 weekly direct flights were made between JFK and the Dominican Republic, with additional flights in December. Most of the flights were offered by American Airlines, and the airline was described as having a virtual monopoly on the route. Around 90% of the passengers on the accident flight were of Dominican descent.

The Guardian described the flight as having "cult status" in Washington Heights, a Dominican area of Manhattan. Belkis Lora, a relative of a passenger on Flight 587, said, "Every Dominican in New York has either taken that flight or knows someone who has. It gets you there early. At home, there are songs about it." Seth Kugel, writing for The New York Times, said, "For many Dominicans in New York, these journeys home are the defining metaphor of their complex push-pull relationship with their homeland; they embody, vividly and poignantly, the tug between their current lives and their former selves. That fact gave [the] tragedy a particularly horrible resonance for New York's Dominicans." He added, "Even before [the] crash, Dominicans had developed a complex love-hate relationship with American Airlines, complaining about high prices and baggage restrictions even while favoring the carrier over other airlines that used to travel the same route." David Rivas, a New York City travel agency owner, said, "For the Dominican to go to Santo Domingo during Christmas and summer is like the Muslims going to Mecca."

The crash did not affect bookings for the JFK–Santo Domingo route. Dominicans continued to book travel on the flights until American Airlines ended services between JFK and Santo Domingo on April 1, 2013.

The intersection of 181st Street and Amsterdam Ave in Washington Heights is named "Flight 587 Way" in honor of the victims.

== Memorial ==
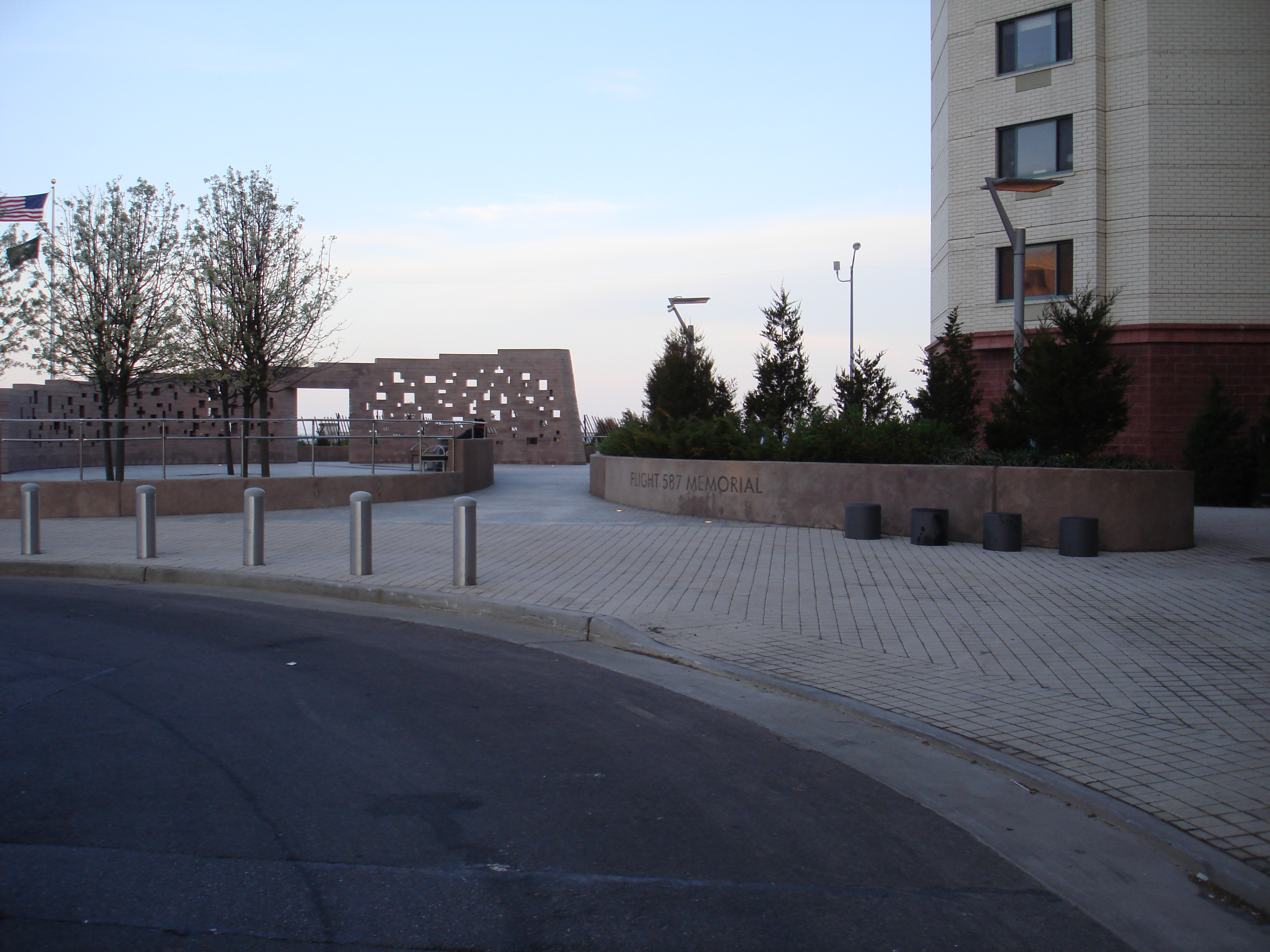
The American Airlines Flight 587 memorial in Rockaway Park

A memorial was constructed in Rockaway Park, the community adjoining Belle Harbor to the east, in memory of the 265 victims of the crash. It is situated beside the Rockaway Beach and Boardwalk at the south end of Beach 116th Street, a major commercial street in the area. It was dedicated on November 12, 2006, the fifth anniversary of the accident, in a ceremony attended by then-Mayor of New York City Michael Bloomberg. A ceremony commemorating the disaster is held annually at the memorial every November 12, featuring a reading of the names of those killed aboard the aircraft and on the ground, with a formal moment of silence observed at 9:16 am, the estimated time of the crash. The memorial wall, designed by Dominican artist Freddy Rodríguez and Situ Studio, has windows and a doorway looking toward the nearby Atlantic Ocean and angled toward the Dominican Republic. It is inscribed with the names of the victims. Atop the memorial is a quotation, in both Spanish and English, from Dominican poet Pedro Mir: "Después no quiero más que paz" (which translates to "Afterwards, I want nothing more than peace").

In a ceremony held on May 6, 2007, at Woodlawn Cemetery in the Bronx, 889 unidentified fragments of human remains of the victims of the crash were entombed in a group of four mausoleum crypts.

== Documentaries ==
Several documentaries have been made concerning the accident.

A 2006 episode of the National Geographic Channel program Seconds from Disaster examined the Flight 587 accident in detail. The episode was titled "Plane Crash in Queens" (also known as "New York Air Crash").

A 2006 episode of Modern Marvels on The History Channel aired an episode titled "Engineering Disasters 20", which featured detailed information on Flight 587. The BBC program Horizon also created an episode about the crash.

The Discovery Channel Canada/National Geographic series Mayday (also called Air Crash Investigation or Air Emergency) dramatized the accident in season 13, episode five, titled "Queens Catastrophe".

An episode of Aircrash Confidential on Discovery Channel also featured Flight 587. The episode was titled "Pilot Error". A 2011 episode of Why Planes Crash featured Flight 587. The episode was titled "Human Error" and aired on MSNBC. A 2020 episode of Black Box Down featured Flight 587.

== See also ==
- 2008 Mexico City Learjet crash
- Clap When You Land by Elizabeth Acevedo, which is loosely based on Flight 587
