= Igor Vernik =

Russian actor (born 1963)

Igor Vernik PAR
- Игорь Верник
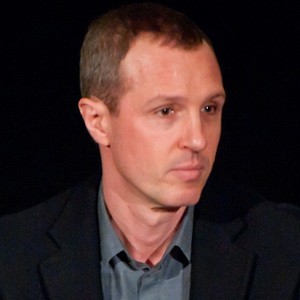
- Vernik in 2012
- Born: Igor Emilievich Vernik; October 11, 1963 (age 63); Moscow, RSFSR, USSR
- Citizenship: Soviet Union; Russia
- Occupations: Actor, broadcaster, radio host, TV producer, singer
- Years active: 1984—present
- Children: 1
- Website: vernik.ru

Igor Emilievich Vernik (Russian: И́горь Эми́льевич Ве́рник; born October 11, 1963) is a Soviet and Russian film and theater actor, producer, television and radio host.

== Biography ==
Igor was born in 1963 in family of Emil Vernik (1924 — 2021), director of the All-Union Radio, People's Artist of Russia and his wife Anna Vernik (1927 — 2009) is a lawyer by education, music school teacher. Twin brother Vadim, journalist and broadcaster.

In 1984 he graduated from the Moscow Art Theater School-Studio (course of Ivan Tarkhanov).

Since 1986 — actor of Moscow Art Theatre School.

From 2000 to 2001, he led the program The Seventh Sense on Channel One Russia.

February 9, 2012, was officially registered as an authorized representative of presidential candidate Mikhail Prokhorov.

Igor Vernik performed in the ballet Nureyev during its premiere as the auctioneer (a vocal role).

He appeared in the first season of the ice show contest Ice Age.

== Selected filmography ==
- Jaguar (1986) as Cava
- Frenzied Bus (1990) as Israeli MIA officer
- The Master and Margarita (1994) as Judas Iscariot
- Heads and Tails (1996) as Felix Barmakov
- 8 ½ $ (1999) as Boba, Stepan's bodyguard
- Savages (2006) as Murzya
- Heat (2006) as employee of the film studio
- 12 (2007) as a witness in golden glasses
- Daddy's Daughters (2008) as cameo
- Love in the Big City 2 (2010) as director of dental clinic
- The White Guard (2012) as Shchur
- Moms (2012) as producer
- Kitchen (2014) as Herman Mikhailovich Land
- Terrible Dad (2022) as Pototsky
- Clipmakers (2023) as himself
- The Master and Margarita (2024) as George Bengalsky

== Awards and honours ==
- Honored Artist of the Russian Federation (1999)
- Meritorious Artist of the Chechen Republic (2013)
- People's Artist of the Russian Federation (2016)
