= Ramada Plaza JFK Hotel =

Former hotel in Queens, New York

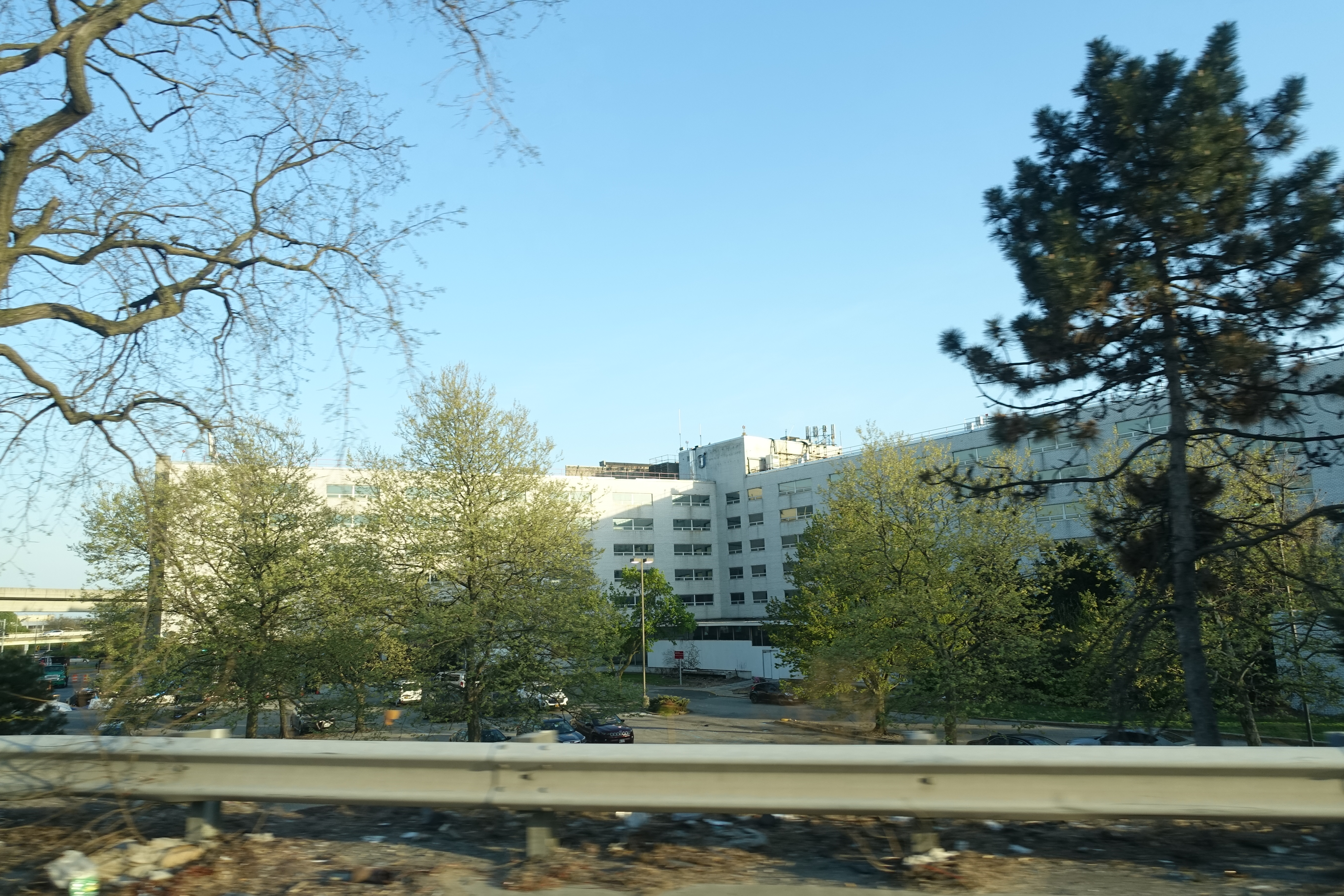
- Former names: International Hotel Travelodge New York JFK
- Hotel chain: Ramada

General information
- Status: Closed
- Type: Hotel
- Location: John F. Kennedy International Airport, Queens, New York City, New York, United States
- Coordinates: 40°39′51″N 73°48′17″W
- Opened: May 8, 1958
- Closed: December 1, 2009 (16 years ago)
- Owner: Port Authority of New York and New Jersey

Technical details
- Material: White brick (façade)
- Floor count: 6

Other information
- Number of rooms: 478

The Ramada Plaza JFK Hotel was a Ramada-branded hotel at John F. Kennedy International Airport in the South Ozone Park neighborhood of Queens in New York City, New York, United States.

== Description ==
While in operation, The Ramada Plaza JFK was JFK Airport's only on-site hotel. It was located in Airport Building 144, a six-story structure. The building had a white brick facade and 478 rooms.

== History ==
The hotel was opened on May 8, 1958 as the International Hotel. Prior to being a Ramada hotel, it was a Forte Hotels-managed property that was branded as the Travelodge New York JFK.

For several years, the Port Authority of New York and New Jersey (PANYNJ), the airport's owner, leased the building and site to the hotel-holding company Westmont Hospitality Group. In 2009, a PANYNJ spokesperson said that Westmont Hospitality Group decided not to renew the lease for 2009.

With the expiration of the lease in late 2008, PANYNJ resumed control of the building and leased the facility to Highgate Holdings for one year, although the PANYNJ preliminary 2010 budget issued in 2009 indicated that an estimated savings of $1 million per month would be achieved by PANYNJ with the reported closing of the hotel due to "declining aviation activity and a need for substantial renovation". The hotel closed on December 1, 2009, with almost 200 employees made redundant and the PANYNJ hoping to construct a new hotel on the airport property. Until TWA Hotel opened within the former TWA Flight Center in 2019, there was no on-site hotel at JFK Airport.

=== Use as temporary housing ===
A series of nearby airplane-crash incidents, the flights of which originated at the airport in the 1990s and 2000s, caused the hotel to be casually referred to as the "heartbreak hotel" when the facilities would be used as the temporary central housing and gathering place for family members of passengers and crew, as well as the media.

The crash of TWA Flight 800 in 1996 originated the use of the hotel facilities for guest housing, bereavement-related services and news gathering for crash-incident-related purposes. Ying Chan, Jose Lambiet and Jere Hester of the Daily News wrote that for the families the hotel became "a makeshift grief counseling center". Many waited there for the remains of their family members to be recovered, identified and released. U.S. President Bill Clinton visited the hotel while it housed TWA Flight 800 next of kin. The hotel also hosted families of Swissair Flight 111 (1998), EgyptAir Flight 990 (1999) and American Airlines Flight 587 (2001) victims.

== See also ==
- List of buildings, sites, and monuments in New York City
- List of hotels in the United States
