= Yuri Grymov =

Russian film director, clipmaker, screenwriter and producer

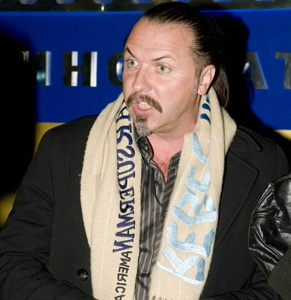
Yuri Grymov in 2009

"A society, if it considers itself civilized, must live by the law. And the inevitability of punishment should deter from rash actions."

— Yuri Grymov, Izvestiya interview

Yuri Vyacheslavovich Grymov (Russian: Ю́рий Вячесла́вович Гры́мов; born 6 July 1965, Moscow, USSR) is a Russian film director, clipmaker, screenwriter, producer. Member of the Public Chamber of the Moscow Oblast, Academician of Motion Picture Arts.

Winner of the Epica Awards (1993, 1994) and Kinotavr Festival (1998)

In 2015–2016, he was the chief director of the "Tsargrad TV" channel. From 2015 to 2019, he was a member of the Public Chamber of the Moscow Region.

He served as inspiration for the character of Gera Kremov in Grigori Konstantinopolsky's cult crime-comedy 8 ½ $.

== Filmography ==
- Men's revelation (in the novel by Renata Litvinova The Third Way) (1996)
- Lessons Anita Tsoi (documentary) (1998)
- Mu-mu (based on the novel by Ivan Turgenev. The new reading of classics (1998)
- The Collector (based on the novel by Levan Varazi The Collector and His Relatives) (2001)
- Kukotsky’s Casus (based on the novel by Lyudmila Ulitskaya) (2005)
- Strangers (2008)
- By the Feel (2010)
