= Whit Monday (film) =

1990 Soviet film

- Russian: Духов день
- Directed by: Sergey Selyanov
- Written by: Mikhail Konovalchuk; Sergey Selyanov
- Starring: Yuriy Shevchuk; Boris Golyatkin; Gennadiy Garbuk; Viktor Semyonovsky; Olga Grigoreva
- Cinematography: Sergey Astakhov
- Music by: Yuri Shevchuk
- Release date: 1990
- Country: Soviet Union
- Language: Russian

Whit Monday (Russian: Духов день) is a 1990 Soviet supernatural drama film directed by Sergey Selyanov.

== Plot ==
The film tells about a man who involuntarily detonates various objects. To understand the reason and meaning of this, he begins to study the history of his family name.

== Cast ==
- Yuriy Shevchuk
- Boris Golyatkin
- Gennadiy Garbuk
- Viktor Semyonovsky
- Olga Grigoreva
- Vladimir Zubenko
- Oleg Korchikov
- Stanislav Landgraf
- Vladimir Golovin
- Aleksandr Anisimov
