= Kitty (2009 film) =

- Russian: Кошечка
- Directed by: Grigory Konstantinopolsky
- Written by: Grigory Konstantinopolsky
- Produced by: Grigory Konstantinopolsky; Andrey Novikov
- Starring: Pavel Derevyanko; Mikhail Efremov; Svetlana Ivanova; Yuri Kolokolnikov; Grigoriy Konstantinopolskiy
- Cinematography: Levan Kapanadze; Sergey Machilskiy; Andrey Makarov; Vladislav Opelyants; Maksim Osadchiy-Korytkovskiy
- Edited by: Dmitriy Slobtsov
- Release date: 2009
- Country: Russia
- Language: Russian

Kitty (Russian: Кошечка) is a 2009 Russian psychedelic comedy film directed by Grigory Konstantinopolsky.

The film tells about five different people: a baby, a teenager, a successful businessman, a loser writer and an elderly ballerina, each of whom believes that he will achieve success and personal happiness.

== Plot ==
The film is structured around five monologues, each narrated by a distinct protagonist: a baby, a teenager, a successful businessman, a struggling writer, and an elderly ballerina.

In the first story, "The Mad Ballerina", an aging, once-aspiring ballerina named Varechka (played by Mikhail Efremov) reflects on her life. Now isolated and accompanied only by her dog, whom she humorously calls Isadora Duncan, Varechka remembers her relentless dedication to ballet, shaped by her mentor’s words: “sacrifice, persistence, fanaticism, and grueling work.” Despite her sacrifices and enduring intrigues and schemes, she never attained a lead role. Aging and sidelined, she clings to cynicism, scoffing at her similarly destitute friends, while refusing to accept that she may have lacked true talent.

The second story, "Marriage of Convenience", follows Viktor (Alexander Strizhenov), a shrewd businessman who, on his wedding day, spies on his fiancée Polina. His interest in Polina stemmed from rumors of her wealth, leading him to invest heavily in winning her over. However, after overhearing wedding guests, he realizes that Polina orchestrated the marriage to secure his wealth, reversing his carefully calculated plan.

In "A Strange Dream", the third story, a one-year-old boy named Seryozha (Viktor Sukhorukov) plots revenge against his nanny, Svetka. Despite his young age, he narrates with an adult’s cynicism and experiences vivid, violent dreams. Planning to stab Svetka, he hesitates when a neighbor's child interrupts. In an elevator encounter with a large dog, his nightmares come to life briefly, but the dog merely licks him, shattering his grim imagination.

The fourth story, "Kitty, or From the Author", follows Pavlik (Yevgeny Stychkin), a struggling writer who finally lands a publishing contract for future novels. While constructing a dream home, he encounters writer’s block, only to find inspiration from his new black cat, who “dictates” his work to him. Buoyed by newfound success, he envisions a future filled with creative output, companionship, and contentment.

In the final story, "Kris-Maria de Levier", 14-year-old Nastya (Svetlana Ivanova) idolizes a pop star named Bol and creates an online persona, Kris-Maria de Levier, to connect with him. To her surprise, Bol responds, mistaking her for her own mother, who used the same pseudonym online, bringing Nastya face-to-face with an unexpected twist in her adolescent fantasy.

== Cast ==
- Pavel Derevyanko as The visitor on wedding (credit only)
- Mikhail Efremov as Ballerina Varechka (credit only)
- Svetlana Ivanova as Nastya (credit only)
- Yuri Kolokolnikov as The visitor on wedding (as Yuriy Kolokolnikov) (credit only)
- Grigoriy Konstantinopolskiy
- Aleksandr Strizhenov as Businessman Viktor (credit only)
- Yevgeny Stychkin as Writer Pavlik (credit only)
- Viktor Sukhorukov as Serezha (credit only)
