= Avangard Leontiev =

Soviet and Russian actor

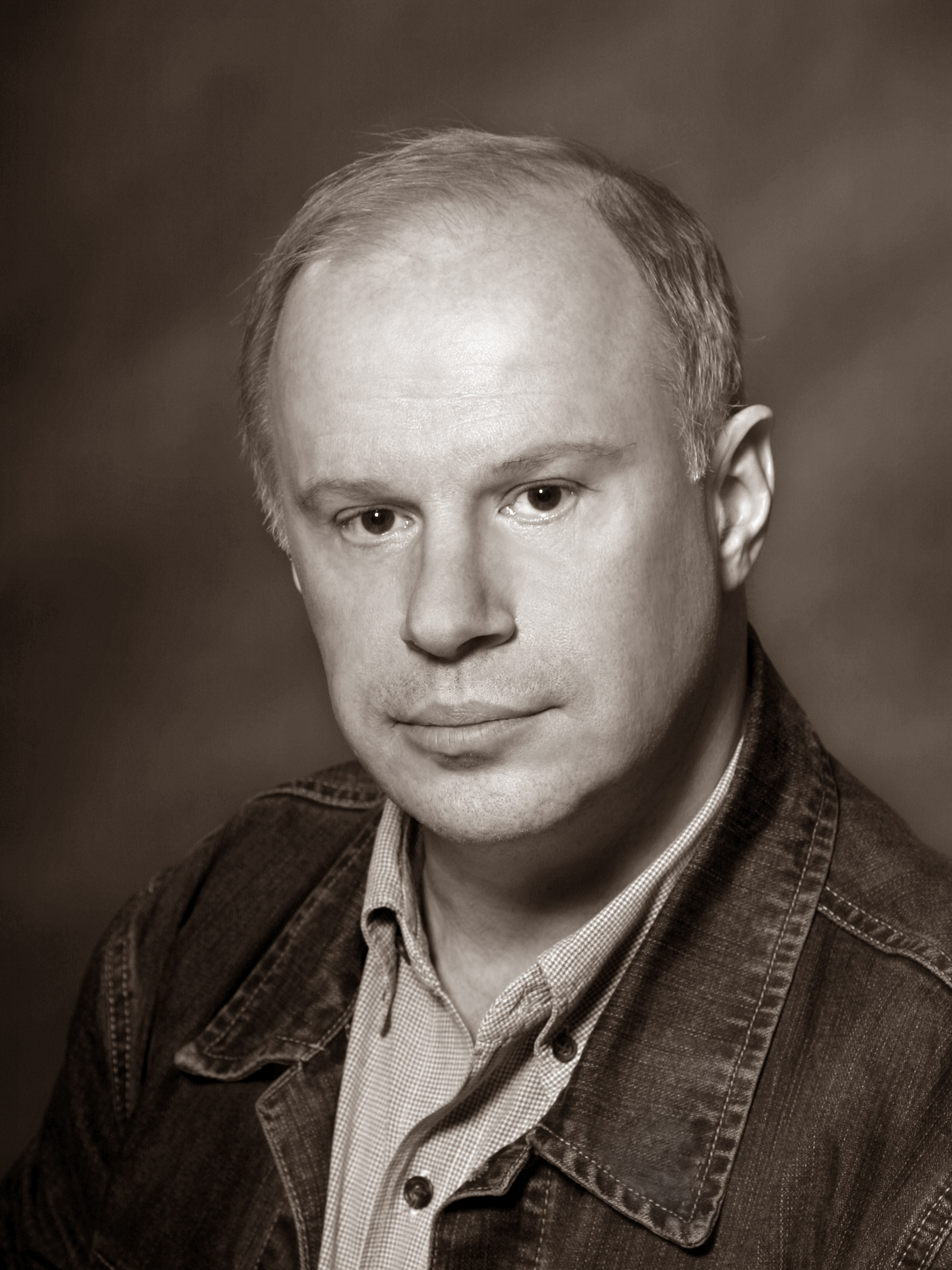
Avangard Leontiev

Avangard Nikolaevich Leontiev (Russian: Аванга́рд Никола́евич Лео́нтьев; born February 27, 1947, in Moscow) is a Soviet and Russian theater and film actor, teacher, professor. People's Artist of the Russian Federation (1995). Laureate of the State Prize of the Russian Federation (1995).

== Selected filmography ==
- Train Stop – Two Minutes (1972) as viewer
- Little Tragedies (1979) as Solomon
- A Few Days from the Life of I. I. Oblomov (1980) as Alexeyev
- Alone and Unarmed (1984) as photographer
- The Tale of Tsar Saltan (1984) as narrator
- Dark Eyes (1987) as official in St. Petersburg
- The Parrot Speaking Yiddish (1990) as Zaremba
- Burnt by the Sun (1994) as Chauffeur
- The Barber of Siberia (1998) as Andrei's uncle
- Silver Lily of the Valley (2000) as episode
- Turning (2002) as manager
- Yesenin (2005) as Anatoly Lunacharsky
- Adjutants of Love (2005) as Paul I of Russia
- Sunstroke (2014) as prestidigitator
- The Age of Pioneers (2017) as Yuri Levitan
- Van Goghs (2018) as Veniamin
