= Ashot Melikjanyan =

Soviet Armenian actor

- Ашот Меликджанян
- Melikjanyan in 1983
- Born: 20 April 1952; Armenian Soviet Socialist Republic
- Died: 12 November 2001 (aged 49); Queens, New York, U.S.
- Citizenship: Soviet Union; United States
- Occupation: Actor
- Years active: 1972–1990

Ashot Melikjanyan or Melikdzhanyan (20 April 1952 — 12 November 2001) was a Soviet Armenian actor.

== Early life, family and education ==
Ashot Melikdjanyan was born in the Soviet Union 20 April 1952.

== Career ==
Melikdjanyan began his acting career at the Yerevan Dramatic Theater. His first on-screen performance was playing the role of Meruzhan in the 1972 film Ayrik. He then starred as the protagonist in the 1979 film Air Pedestrians, filmed at the Uzbekfilm film studio.

He starred in the 1983 film Without Much Risk which was filmed at the Gorky Film Studio. Melikdjanyan's last appearance was in the 1990 film Yearning, which was filmed at the Armenfilm studio.

After the Soviet Union collapsed, Melikdjanyan emigrated with his family to the United States, where he worked at a jewelry factory which supervised one of its branches in the Dominican Republic.

== Death ==
Melikdjanyan was killed in the crash of American Airlines Flight 587 in New York City on 12 November 2001.

== Filmography ==
Year		Title	Role	Notes
1990	f	Yearning	Aram	
1985	f	Captain Arakel	Varuzhan	
1983	f	Without Much Risk	Avetisov Levon Surenovich (main role) inspector of Criminal Investigation, Senior Police Lieutenant	
1980	f	Flight Starts from the Ground	Armen (the son of Khoren)	
1980	f	Air Pedestrians	Akmal Tursunbayev (main role) voiced by Alexey Safonov	
1978	tf	And Happiness Is Near	Character name unspecified	
1973	f	The Bad Good Man	Achmianov	
1972	f	Ayrik	Meruzhan (voiced by Stanislav Zakharov)	

== See also ==
- List of actors
- List of Soviet people
