= Russian Demon =

Russian Bes
- Directed by: Grigory Konstantinopolsky
- Written by: Grigory Konstantinopolsky
- Produced by: Andrey Novikov; Grigory Konstantinopolsky; Vladislava Fetisova
- Starring: Ivan Makarevich; Grigory Konstantinopolsky; Lyubov Aksyonova
- Cinematography: Matvey Stavitsky
- Production company: Artlight
- Release date: 2018
- Country: Russia
- Language: Russian

Russian Demon (Russian: Русский Бес, romanized: Russkiy Bes) is a 2018 Russian black comedy film directed by Grigory Konstantinopolsky, starring Ivan Makarevich.

In June 2018 the film competed in the main program of the Kinotavr Film Festival, where director Grigory Konstantinopolsky received the award for Best Director.

== Plot ==
The story takes place in contemporary Russia. The main character, designer and artist Svyatoslav Ivanov (Ivan Makarevich), is in love with Asya (Lyubov Aksyonova), the daughter of an influential banker. Hoping to provide her with a comfortable life, Svyatoslav decides to open his own restaurant, titled “Russian Bes.” To launch the business, he takes out a loan from Asya’s father, Pyotr Aleksandrovich (Vitaly Kishchenko).

Soon, however, Svyatoslav encounters serious obstacles. Someone deliberately sabotages his business and even attempts to kill him. As the plot develops, Svyatoslav begins to see a mysterious Black Man (Grigory Konstantinopolsky), who may be a hallucination. Descending into paranoia and violence, Svyatoslav struggles to protect both his business and his relationship with Asya. He gradually loses his grip on reality, and his increasingly aggressive actions culminate in a psychological breakdown.

In the final scenes, it becomes unclear what is real and what exists only in Svyatoslav’s imagination. The film ends ambiguously, leaving room for various interpretations. The blurred boundary between reality and hallucination is intentional, prompting viewers to question the true nature of the events depicted.

== Cast ==
- Ivan Makarevich — Svyatoslav Ivanov
- Grigory Konstantinopolsky — Black Man
- Lyubov Aksyonova — Asya
- Vitaly Kishchenko — Pyotr Aleksandrovich, Asya’s father, a banker
- Viktoria Isakova — Polina Viktorovna
- Yuliya Aug — Alexandra Stepanovna Trushkina
- Ksenia Rappoport — Masha
- Timofey Tribuntsev — Zakhar Zakharovich Zakharov, investigator
- Aleksandr Strizhenov — Father Grigory
- Mikhail Yefremov — Svyatoslav’s friend

== Awards ==
- 2018 — Kinotavr Film Festival — Best Director (Grigory Konstantinopolsky)
