= The Parrot Speaking Yiddish =

- Russian: Попугай, говорящий на идиш
- Directed by: Efraim Sevela
- Written by: Efraim Sevela
- Produced by: Andrei Bortsov; Micha Lamper; Sergei Senin
- Starring: Ramaz Ioseliani; Avangard Leontiev; Maria Politseymako; Semyon Farada; Algis Matulionis
- Cinematography: Vadim Avloshenko; Vladimir Dmitrievskiy; Feliks Gilevich
- Edited by: Lidiya Milioti
- Music by: Isaac Schwarts
- Release date: 1990
- Countries: Soviet Union; Germany
- Language: Russian

The Parrot Speaking Yiddish (Russian: Попугай, говорящий на идиш) is a 1990 Soviet adventure film directed by Efraim Sevela.

== Cast ==
- Ramaz Ioseliani as Yankel Lapidus
- Avangard Leontiev as Zaremba
- Marina Politseymako as Pani Lapidus
- Semyon Farada
- Algis Matulionis as Kurt
- Audris Chadaravicius
- Anna Afanasyeva
- Yuliya Menakerman
- Karina Moritts
- Vadim Zhuk
