= Yearning (1990 film) =

- Directed by: Frunze Dovlatyan
- Written by: Henrikh Malyan, Ruben Hovsepyan
- Music by: Martin Vardazaryan
- Production company: Armenfilm
- Release dates: 1 October 1990 (Yerevan); September 1991 (Moscow)
- Running time: 157 minutes
- Country: Soviet Union
- Language: Armenian

Yearning (Armenian: Կարոտ), also known as Karot, is a 1990 Soviet drama film directed by Frunze Dovlatyan and based on the novella of the same name by Rachia Kochar. The film premiered on October 1, 1990, in Yerevan, and was later released in Moscow in September 1991.

== History ==
Produced by Armenfilm, Yearning was directed by Frunze Dovlatyan at the age of 65. The film addresses the theme of divided Armenia, a result of historical events that split the country into two parts. The screenplay was written by Henrikh Malyan and Ruben Hovsepyan, while the music was composed by Martin Vardazaryan. It is an adaptation of Rachia Kochar's novella Yearning, from his 1965 collection White Book. Kochar's work was inspired by personal experiences and stories from his family and friends, many of whom fled from Western Armenia to Eastern Armenia during the Armenian Genocide.

== Plot ==
Set in 1937, the story follows an elderly man, Arakel, who has been displaced from his ancestral village due to the Armenian Genocide. Tormented by longing and memories of his homeland, he crosses the state border into Turkey in an attempt to return to his birthplace. His journey, however, ends tragically with his death.

== Cast ==
- Raphael Atoyan as Arakel
- Gala Novents as Sanam
- Ashot Melikjanyan as Aram
- Asmik Kartashyan as Asmik
- Sos Petrosyan as Tigran
- Mikael Azaryan as Andranik
- Nerses Hovhannisyan as Yenok
- Alexander Hovhannisyan as Mushegh
- Levon Sharafyan as Shavarshyan
- Azat Gasparyan as Sarkisov
- Arthur Shakhverdyan as Melnikov
- Armen Santrosyan as Investigator
- Rafael Khachikyan as Investigator
- Arevshat Unanyan as Investigator
- Nara noïan as Mute Woman
- R. Gasparyan as Sheikh
- Hrayr Karapetyan as Marif
