= 8 ½ $ =

8 1/2 $
- Directed by: Grigory Konstantinopolsky
- Written by: Grigory Konstantinopolsky
- Produced by: Galina Shadur; Alexander Antipov
- Starring: Ivan Okhlobystin; Fyodor Bondarchuk; Olesya Potashinskaya; Vladimir Menshov; Natalya Andrejchenko
- Cinematography: Yuri Lyubshin; Evgeniy Korzhenkov
- Edited by: Natalia Sazhina; Albina Antipenko
- Production companies: Gorky Film Studio; Film Studio "Premier Film"
- Release date: 1999
- Running time: 95 minutes
- Country: Russia
- Language: Russian

8 1/2 $ (Russian: Восемь с половиной долларов, romanized: Vosem s polovinoi dollarov, Eight and a Half Dollars) is a 1999 Russian cult crime-comedy film by Grigory Konstantinopolsky. It was his directorial debut. Due to copyright issues it was released in official rental only in 2011. The title and the story references Federico Fellini's film 8 1/2.

== Plot ==
Director Gera Kremov earns a living by shooting commercials but dreams of directing a feature film. He gets acquainted with Matilda, a girlfriend of gangster Fyodor, and enters into a close relationship with her.

After some time, having received money from Fyodor, he shoots a music video with Matilda in the main role and the conversation finally turns about making a real movie (with her in the title role). For the production of the film, Gera asks for 300,000 dollars, and Fyodor, having agreed, proposes to visit him and to immediately arrange everything. However, in the office an unpleasant surprise awaits Gera: Fyodor is well aware of the not-so platonic relations between Gera and Matilda. Fyodor is about to take immediate measures, but he chokes on a pistachio and dies. The couple spends 150,000 dollars during one night of fun, and Fyodor's twin brother Stepan comes to them next morning for the money. Perplexed Gera solves the problem by calling his acquaintance, a mafiosi by the name of Spartak. He agrees with Stepan that Gera will shoot and hand over the film a month later.

Meanwhile, Stepan finds out that Gera and Matilda had an affair and that 150,000 dollars were squandered. He tries to convince Matilda that Gera will betray her. Gera becomes indifferent towards Matilda, because the director tired of monotony, is carried away by Spartak's wife, actress Ksenia. This leads to the fact that Spartak offers to make a film where the main role will be played by Ksenia. Gera confidently agrees, requesting $1,000,000 from Spartak. The conversation between Spartak and Gera is recorded on a tape which Ksenia gives to Matilda.

Later Stepan and Spartak meet on the set to discuss the Gera's future work. But their negotiations do not lead to anything fruitful, it ends in a shootout in which Spartak, Ksenia, bodyguards die, with Stepan becoming wounded. After the cruel scene Gera leaves and looks for Matilda but winds up getting ran over by her jeep. Matilda gives the cassette to him, takes the Spartak's suitcase with the million and leaves. Awakened Stepan unsuccessfully tries to stop Matilda then aims at Gera, but after choking on a pistachio, dies. Gera breaths easy, lights a "joint" and "flies away."

== Cast ==
- Ivan Okhlobystin — Gera Kremov
- Fyodor Bondarchuk — Fyodor, Stepan
- Olesya Potashinskaya — Matilda
- Vladimir Menshov — Sergei Spartak
- Natalya Andrejchenko — Ksenia Potekhina (voiced by Renata Litvinova)
- Vladimir Shainsky — Lyosik
- Igor Vernik — Boba, Stepan's bodyguard
- Vyacheslav Razbegaev — Coca, Stepan's bodyguard
- Angelina Chernova — Irma
- Armen Petrosyan — Armen
- Ramil Sabitov — Gera's assistant
- Gosha Kutsenko — Native American
- Ali Ibragimov — Native American
- Grigori Konstantinopolsky — cameo
- Andrey Makarevich — cameo
- Alexander Medvedev — cameo
- Vladimir Presnyakov Jr. — cameo
- Andrei I — advertiser

== Production ==
Filming took almost two and a half years. This happened because Konstantinopolsky originally conceived the project as a low-budget independent film, but could not keep up with the budget and the timeframe allotted to him. Then the director found additional sponsors who were able to ensure the shooting of the picture.

The movie was filmed in 1999, but because of copyright infringement concerning the used music, its release was postponed. At the same time the film was published on video cassettes in the 2000s and was shown on television. The film was placed in an archive, where it lay for seven years. In 2006, the tape was found, but it was ruined due to improper storage conditions, it was necessary to restore the sound, update the music (all musicians allowed to use their music for free, only Ennio Morricone requested $40 thousand, and his music from the film had to be removed) At the same time, the image was converted into 3D format. These works added another 4 million rubles to the budget.

== Interesting facts ==
- It is commonly believed that the character of Gera Kremov was based on Yuri Grymov.
- Because of a conflict with the director, Natalia Andreichenko, who played the role of Ksenia, did not allow her name to appear in the credits (she is credited as "Natalia the Deceived" in the film). Her role was voiced by Renata Litvinova.
- In the credits Gosha Kutsenko is credited by his birth name, Yuri.
- A poster featuring Quentin Tarantino is displayed in the film.
- When the film was being remastered for the 2011 release, Konstantinopolsky wrote a script for the sequel – "8.5 dollars 2222". So far the sequel has not been realized.

== Awards ==
For the film, Grigori Konstantinopolsky received the Best Film Debut award from the Russian Guild of Film Critics.
