= Efraim Sevela =

Russian writer (1928–2010)

Efim Drabkin (Russian: Ефим Евелевич Драбкин), better known by his pen name Efraim Sevela (Russian: Эфраим Севела, Hebrew: אפרים סבלה) (8 March 1928 in Babruysk, Belarus – 18 August 2010 in Moscow) was a Soviet writer, screenwriter, director, producer, who after his emigration from the Soviet Union lived in Israel, US and Russia.

== Life in the USSR before emigration ==
Efraim Sevela was born to Jewish parents. His father was an officer. During World War 2, him and his family were evacuated from the frontline in 1941. After finishing school Sevela was admitted into the Belarusian State University and became a screenwriter for many Soviet patriotic films. At the end of the 1960s, Sevela joined the Jewish Soviet dissidents, the so-called Refuseniks, and in 1971 was one of those occupying a Soviet government main building in Moscow, with the request that Soviet Jews be allowed to emigrate to Israel. Subsequently, he was granted permission to emigrate.

== Israel, 1971-1977 ==
While living in Israel, Sevela published a few books in Russian. According to his own words, the 45-year-old Sevela participated in the Yom Kippur War where he was wounded. In his book Stop the Plane - I'll Get Off (1977), Sevela harshly criticises Israel's system of integrating Jewish immigrants and bureaucracy.

== After Israel, 1977-1990 ==
In 1977 he left Israel for the United States. Efraim Sevela worked and lived in many cities such as London, Paris, and West Berlin.

== Return to the USSR and life in post-Soviet Russia ==
In 1990, Sevela returned to the USSR and, as a director, directed five films based on his own scripts - The Parrot Speaking Yiddish (1990), Noah's Ark (1992), Chopin's Nocturne (1992), Charity Ball (1993). In 1995, Ephraim Sevela made his last self-documentary, Lord, Who Am I?

In Moscow, he lived on Chernyakhovsky street, 3.

Ephraim Sevela died on 18 August 2010 in Moscow. He was buried at the Mitinsky cemetery.

== Works ==
After emigrating in 1971, he began his writing career, writing in Paris (on his way to Israel) a critically acclaimed book of short stories, Legends of Invalidnaya Street. Subsequently, he wrote several novels, short stories, screenplays, autobiographical prose. Among the published books are “Stop the Plane – I’ll Get Off”, “Monya Tsatskes the Standard Bearer”, “Mom”, “Viking”, “Toyota Corolla”, “Men’s Conversation in a Russian Bathhouse”, “Parrot Speaking Yiddish”, “Why there is no heaven on earth”, “I Love New York”, “Patriot with unwashed ears”, “Wisdom tooth”, “Sell your mother”, “Everything not in a human way”. The collected works of the writer in 6 volumes (1996) and a number of collections of selected works were published.

Ephraim Sevela turned to cinema again in 1986, shooting in Poland the film Lullaby (1986), consisting of three lyrical film novellas, united by the theme of life in the ghetto during the Second World War.

== Filmography ==
Screenwriter:

- Annushka (1959)
- Nashi sosedi (1957)
- Krepkiy oreshek (1967)
- Goden k nestroevoy (1968)

Director:

- Lullaby (1986) / Kołysanka / Колыбельная
- The Parrot Speaking Yiddish (1990) / Попугай, говорящий на идиш
- Noah's Ark (1992) / Ноев ковчег
- Charity Ball (1993) / Благотворительный бал
- The White Dunes (1996) / Белые дюны

Actor:

- Noah's Ark (1992) / Ноев ковчег

Producer:

- Noah's Ark (1992) / Ноев ковчег
- Charity Ball (1993) / Благотворительный бал

== Novels ==
- Monya Tsatskes - Standard Bearer (1977, Jerusalem)
- Farewell, Israel! (1977)
- Stop the Plane - I'll Get Off (1977, Jerusalem)
- Sell Your Mother (1981, Jerusalem)
- We Were Not Like Other People
- Toyota Corolla
- Legends From Invalid Street (USA, 1971)
- Truth is for Strangers
- Why There is no Heaven on Earth
- Odessa-Mama (2003, Russia)
