= Comrade Chkalov Crosses the North Pole =

1990 film

Perekhod tovarishcha Chkalova cherez severnyy polyus
- Directed by: Maksim Pezhemsky
- Written by: Maksim Pezhemsky
- Starring: Vladimir Baranov
- Distributed by: Lenfilm
- Release date: 1990
- Running time: 23 minutes
- Country: Soviet Union
- Language: Russian

Comrade Chkalov Crosses the North Pole (Russian: Переход товарища Чкалова через Северный полюс, romanized: Perekhod tovarishcha Chkalova cherez severnyy polyus) is a 1990 Soviet comedy short film directed by Maksim Pezhemsky. It was screened in the Un Certain Regard section at the 1991 Cannes Film Festival.

== Plot ==
Aviators Chkalov, Baidukov, and navigator Belyakov undertake a journey across the North Pole on foot, in a surreal retelling of the historic 1937 flight. Upon reaching the Pole, Chkalov plants the Soviet flag on the Earth's axis, causing the planet to reverse its rotation. The crew then traverses the Arctic and, in the film's conclusion, bonds with Black Canadian street sweepers. Together, they watch black fireworks against the bright sky and listen to a speech by Valery Chkalov from the 1941 film Valery Chkalov.

== Cast ==
- Vladimir Baranov
- Viktor Bychkov
- Semyon Furman
- Aleksandr Zavyalov
- Abdullah Khalilulin
