= Maksim Pezhemsky =

Russian film director

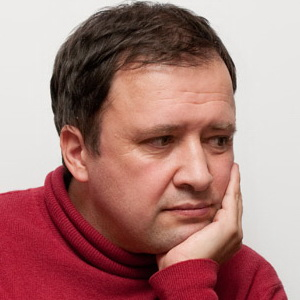
- Born: 30 March 1963 (age 63); Zeya, Russia
- Occupations: Film director Screenwriter
- Years active: 1990-present

Maksim Pezhemsky (born 30 March 1963) is a Russian film director and screenwriter. His film Perekhod tovarishcha Chkalova cherez severnyy polyus was screened in the Un Certain Regard section at the 1991 Cannes Film Festival.

== Filmography ==
- Perekhod tovarishcha Chkalova cherez severnyy polyus (1990)
- Plenniki udachi (1993)
- Zhestkoe vremya (1997)
- Mama ne goryuy (1997)
- Kak by ne tak (2003)
- Mama ne goryuy 2 (2005)
- Univer (TV series, 2008)
- Lubov morkov 2 (2008)
- Our Russia. The Balls of Fate (2010)
- Interny (TV series, 2010)
