= Aleksandr Shapiro =

Ukrainian director, writer and editor (born 1969)

- Born: January 1, 1969 (age 57); Vladivostok, USSR
- Occupations: director, writer, editor

Aleksandr Shapiro (Russian: Александр Шапиро; born January 1, 1969) is a Ukrainian director, writer and editor. His movies were part of the program of international film festivals in Berlin International Film Festival, Cannes Film Festival, etc.

== Cinema ==
Cicuta, Ukraine, 2003

Guide, Ukraine, 2004

Happypeople, Ukraine, 2005

Casting, Ukraine, 2008

== Sources ==
- Kinopoisk, about Aleksandr Shapiro (in Russian)
- Kino-Teatr, about Aleksandr Shapiro (in Russian)
- Jewish News, interview (in Russian)
- KUT: "Послевкусие "Цикуты" Александра Шапиро…" (in Russian)
- Interview (in Russian)
- Alexander Shapiro: HappyPeople (2006) and Casting (2008) (in English)
