= Lokshin =

Lokshin, Lockshin (Russian: Локшин) is a Jewish surname. Notable people with the surname include:

- Aleksandr Lokshin (1920–1987), Russian composer of classical music
- Arnold Lockshin (born 1939), American-born Russian scientist
- Mikhail Lockshin (born 1981), American-born Russian film director
- Richard A. Lockshin (born 1937), Retired American cell biologist
- Michael D. Lockshin (born 1937), Professor Emeritus of Medicine at Weill Cornell Medicine and the Director Emeritus of the Barbara Volcker Center for Women and Rheumatic Diseases
- Steve Lockshin (born 1966), American financial advisor
