= The Silver Skates (film) =

2020 Russian film by Michael Lockshin

- Theatrical release poster
- Directed by: Michael Lockshin
- Written by: Roman Kantor
- Based on: Hans Brinker, or The Silver Skates by Mary Mapes Dodge
- Produced by: Petr Anurov (ru); Leonid Vereshchagin (ru); Anton Zlatopolskiy (ru); Rafael Minasbekyan; Nikita Mikhalkov; Grigoriy Stoyalov
- Starring: Fedor Fedotov; Sonya Priss; Kirill Zaytsev; Yuri Borisov; Aleksei Guskov; Severija Janusauskaite; Yuri Kolokolnikov; Timofey Tribuntsev; Alexandra Revenko
- Cinematography: Igor Grinyakin
- Edited by: Maria Likhacheva; Dmitry Slobtsov
- Music by: Guy Farley
- Production companies: Central Partnership; KIT Film Studio; Kinoslovo; Studio TriTe; Russia-1; CGF Company; AvtoRadio; Gazprom-Media; Cinema Fund
- Distributed by: Central Partnership; Netflix (International)
- Release dates: October 1, 2020 (Moscow Film Festival); December 10, 2020 (Russia)
- Running time: 136 minutes
- Country: Russia
- Languages: Russian, English, French
- Budget: ₽500 million
- Box office: ₽490.1 million in Russia; $7.6 million (total amount); $7.7 million (outside the CIS)

The Silver Skates (Russian: Сере́бряные коньки́, romanized: Serebryanye konki, also in some languages known as City of Ice) is a 2020 Russian epic period romantic adventure film directed by Michael Lockshin in his feature directorial debut, with a screenplay written by Roman Kantor, and produced by Petr Anurov. The film is based on the American novel Hans Brinker, or The Silver Skates by Mary Mapes Dodge.

The story is mainly set in 1899 and New Year 1900 in Saint Petersburg, capital of the Russian Empire. The city's ice-covered rivers and canals act as broad avenues, traversed on ice-skates and sleds, with markets and winter festivals on the ice. Social classes mix in this winter wonderland, and the courier Matvey crosses paths with the aristocrat Alisa, who is an intellectual girl from a noble family. The film stars Fedor Fedotov and Sonya Priss, alongside Kirill Zaytsev, Yuri Borisov, Aleksei Guskov, Severija Janusauskaite, Yuri Kolokolnikov, Timofey Tribuntsev, and Alexandra Revenko in supporting roles. Also it includes the Irish actress Cathy Belton and French actor Denis Lavant. Principal photography lasted from January to May 2019.

The Silver Skates was chosen as the opening film of the 42nd Moscow International Film Festival, where it premiered on October 1, 2020. A limited theatrical release (due to the covid pandemic) was scheduled for December 10, 2020. The film was also shown in IMAX cinemas. The film collected more than 100 million rubles for the highest-grossing opening weekend of its film screening and brought the total amount of 490.1 million rubles to the show times, despite the covid epidemic quarantine in Russia, compared to a production budget of 500 million rubles.

The global rights to the film were acquired by Netflix. The Silver Skates is the first Russian film to be released on the platform in the Netflix Originals category. The film was No. 1 in many territories, and in the top-10 in Europe and the US.

The film won Best Picture awards at both the Golden Eagle Awards and Producer's Guild awards (2020).

== Plot ==
December 1899; Imperial Saint Petersburg's rivers and canals freeze over, transforming the capital city into a fairytale-like wonderland; the markets-on-ice allows ice skaters to partake in commerce and enjoy various attractions.

18-year-old Matvey Polyakov is an ice-skating courier working for a local patisserie. Thanks to his skill with the heirloom silver skates inherited from his father Petr (named in credits), a lamplighter.

The tsarist minister Nikolai Vyazemsky's daughter Alisa Vyazemskaya chafes against the expectations, customs, and superstition of the upper class; she seeks to study the sciences and chemistry specifically, but is forced to hide her interests from her father, who, like many Russian aristocrats of that time, believes that a woman would be better off without higher education; he believes it "only produces free-thinkers and rebels". Her socialite stepmother Severina Genrikhovna, who believes in occultism such as astrology, dislikes her independent nature and suggests to Nikolai that she should be married off. Knyaz (translated as "Prince") Arkady Trubetskoy, the stern and ambitious Captain of the Guard, seeks her hand in marriage for the wealth inherited from her late mother.

A few days before the dawn of the 20th century, Matvey loses his job due to tardiness, as the street he took was closed for the passage of the aristocratic Vyazemskys. Going home, his father displays a severe and prolonged cough. At Matvey's urging they eventually seek a doctor's opinion, where he discovers that his father has developed late-stage consumption; Doctor Grigoriy Anatoliyevich tells him that to his knowledge, the only chance for a cure is at a German clinic in Baden-Baden, which the Polyakovs could not afford.

With nothing to lose, Matvey seeks out a gang of pickpockets named the Ice Gang, that he encountered on the canals the day he lost his job. Their leader "Alex" is impressed by Matvey's speed and agility; he is a proponent of Marx's ideas about expropriation, which the other members "Mukha", "Gengis", and "Graf" support. Matvey trains with the Ice Gang, learning the sleight of hand inherent to pickpocketing to pay for his father's treatment. The gang steals into the Vyazemsky mansion, where they challenge Matvey to leave a dew graffiti on a window. Matvey climbs onto Alisa's balcony where she confronts him. Matvey spooks her, leaving him burnt by her lamp.

In his first heist, Matvey manages to steal two invitations to a ball on ice in the courtyard of the Saint Michael's Castle, organized by the Imperial Ice Skating Club. After Mukha tries to downplay Matvey's initial success, and Matvey receives a makeover, Matvey and Alex enter the ball; Alex teaching him how to blend in with the nobles so as to reap the golden opportunity. Alisa is also there; she is formally acquainted to Prince Arkady, who had invited her there. Alex and Matvey steals from the assembled nobility, who are entranced by the Prince's display of skating prowess. Alisa and Matvey catch each other and she proposes a deal: Alisa won't reveal Matvey's crimes, but he must assist her in entering the Bestuzhev Courses as a student: according to the law of the time, this requires the consent of a male companion or her father. As the thieves escape, Alex reminds Matvey of his and Alisa's vast difference in class, telling him to "remember where [Matvey] came from". The next day, Alisa feigns a fever; after absconding she meets Matvey outside the college. Although Dmitri Mendeleev himself enthusiastically endorses Alisa's candidacy at the entrance exam, the scheme fails because the consent must be written, and Matvey cannot write. Alisa fumes at their failure, but Matvey connects with her on the return trip to her mansion; she admits that she has little understanding of the lives of the common man and her wealth of privilege, both due to her class, and she openly considers Matvey's invitation of a date.

The heist at the ball proved to be lucrative, however, Matvey's father becomes suspicious of him and the amount of money he gives, eventually rejecting it and the possibility of treatment because of the dishonest work his son committed for them. Matvey quarrels with him; he challenges the existence of God, which his father angrily rebuffs him for, and leaves home to go live with Alex and the gang at their base: a derelict wooden frigate frozen into the ice in the Gulf of Finland. Due to several high-profile losses at the ball, including the Grand duke's heirloom pocket watch (the theft of which Nikolai proclaims to be terrorism), the police plot a sting operation on Prince Arkady's initiative, who've long investigated the Ice Gang.

On Christmas night the Vyazemskys exchange gifts; from Severina, Nikolai receives a "locomobile"; the third such machine in Petersburg, while Alisa receives a cage for her cherished white rabbit who has been troubling her parents. Alisa continues to feign her illness to avoid attending Christmas Mass with her parents. Matvey arrives and takes her on his promised date along the canals where they eventually meet Alex and his girlfriend Margo at a circus. By the end they realize they are in love with each other, kissing on her balcony, but Alisa reveals that she is to be engaged.

The next day, Mukha attempts to pickpocket undercover policeman Aleksander Ivanovich and is handcuffed; the sting operation threatens to ensnare Matvey, Mukha, and Duke, who are on the ice. Alex and Arkady independently oversee the ambush of Guards from a bridge above the canal; Alex tells Genghis to go back home before the Prince notices their presence. In the subsequent chase Duke is captured, while Matvey and Mukha escape and reconcile. The Prince tracks Matvey down and incapacitates him with a hooked staff, but Alex comes to his aid and shoots the Prince's right leg with a Nagant, hobbling him. Matvey decides to return home, where he finds his father has died. He reminisces on the time his father taught him to iceskate and his advice on Matvey's dishonesty, and leaves an oil lamp at his grave.

In the same evening, Alisa and Arkady "volunteer" for the French magician Fourier's performance; Fourier ignites a bowl of fuel using candles that Alisa and Arkady carried and sets his hands ablaze, and tells the audience that the flames do not burn him because of the "compatible energies of Arkady and Alisa". Alisa considers this performance a stupid farce and unveils Fourier's cold flame trick to the assembled nobles in French, humiliating her stepmother. Her father barges into her room, and catches her reading the copy of Kapital that was gifted to her by Alex. Nikolai angrily compares her to the Dekabrists and orders that her library of books be burned; Alisa's governess, the prim Englishwoman Miss Jackson, is taken aback by his outburst and resigns. Miss Jackson reveals that Alisa has inspired her to stop living for the sake of others and choose what she truly wants in life, and tells Alisa the most difficult decisions are sometimes those easiest executed.

Alisa absconds yet again and finds the Ice Gang's hideout with Margo's help. She tells Matvey that the jewelry she has stolen away with could buy train tickets to Paris and the treatment for his father. To this, he remains silent, and Alisa hugs him as a sign of comfort and understanding. Alisa is given Alex's cabin for the night and she asks the accompanying Matvey if he would come with her to Paris, to which he responds with a kiss. They proceed to consummate their love for each other.

As the two talk in bed, the ship is surrounded by the Captain Prince and his men who start a fire that engulfs the ship; the ship's location having been tortured out of the captured Duke. Matvey and Alisa leave the rest of the Ice Gang behind to Alex's displeasure, as he intends to use her as a hostage. Genghis, Margo, and Mukha are captured as they attempt to escape the ship. Alex incapacitates Matvey and executes his plan, demanding assurance of all his comrades' escape (including the traitor Duke) for Alisa's safety, which Arkady gives his word for. During her descent, Alisa's rope harness burns and snaps; she is narrowly caught by Matvey who lowers her down to Arkady. Matvey confronts Alex who defuses Matvey's rage by resigning himself to it. The two cynically observe that the Prince's word proves to be in bad faith, as the assembled police opens fire on them and recaptures the four escapees. Alex tells him to jump overboard as the fire has weakened the ice sufficiently for a water landing. When Matvey asks of him he tearfully replies "the captain leaves last, or he sinks to the bottom". When Matvey insists on waiting Alex replies: "See you on the other side". As they both run off the bowsprit Alex shoots into the air to draw attention to him and allows Officer Ivanovich to shoot him; he sinks into the frigid water and drowns.

Matvey manages to emerge from the sea and falls into a coma before fishermen take him to Anatoliyevich's hospital, who immediately attempts to treat him for hypothermia. The memory of his father restores his will to live; Doctor Grigoriy explains that Mr. Polyakov was brought to the clinic before his death and returns the money Matvey handed over for treatment, which Matvey, respecting his father's wishes, returns most of it.

As New Year's Day approaches, Alisa dissociates after she learns that her father gave full consent to her marriage with Prince Arkady, who tries to win her over. The Vyazemskys attend a costume ball at the Great Gatchina Palace to announce Alisa's betrothal. Matvey infiltrates the ball, and reveals himself and two train tickets to Alisa, which she joyfully accepts. As Nikolai announces his daughter's betrothal, Arkady attempts to return with her, but he merely finds one of the train tickets; Matvey had dropped it due to a butler's intrusion. Matvey and Alisa skate away towards Vitebsky railway station with Arkady pursuing on horseback. At the platform the couple discover the missing ticket; Matvey spots the incoming Arkady with the second ticket and asks for Alisa to be kept on the train no matter what before intercepting Arkady on the platform. Matvey prevails in the ensuing struggle and runs back with the ticket, jumping onto the caboose to a waiting Alisa, but Arkady borrows a Nagant from a station officer and shoots Matvey's heart. The silver skates catch the bullet and saves Matvey, and the couple make it to Paris.

Four years later, Nikolai Vyazemsky visits Dmitri Mendeleev to tell him that he knows of his secret correspondence with his daughter. The jubilant Mendeleev tells him that Alisa has made great strides in the study of chemistry and is set to receive an academic degree within a year, which will allow her to work in all prestigious universities in the West. Vyazemsky asks the directorate of the university, where the Bestuzhev Courses are held, to amend the charter so that women will be able to teach there; he realizes this is the only way to have his daughter close again. Subsequently, Alisa lectures a class of women on chemistry with Mendeleev and Nikolai in attendance: she elaborates the reaction that allows fire to be "cold to the touch". The film ends with Alisa, Matvey, and their young son Petya, named after his late paternal grandfather, learning how to ice skate.

== Cast ==
- Fedor Fedotov as Matvey Polyakov

Matvey is a poor lamplighter's son, his only treasure an inherited silver-plated skates. Matvey dreams of winning Alisa's heart, the two star-crossed due to their differing social statuses. He introduces her to his world, where you can just be happy without any conventions. When simple courtship is no longer enough, he enters into a struggle for his beloved with a court careerist.

- Sonya Priss as Alisa Vyazemskaya (English: Alice Maria Augusta von Schlesenberg-Vyazemskaya)

Alisa, a major dignitary's daughter, deeply interested in science. She learns that she is going to marry Prince Arkady Trubetskoy. When she becomes acquainted with Matvey, a simple lamplighter's son, Alisa re-evaluates her own life and decides on the impossible, it seemed, for a representative of high society – hand in hand with a lover – a commoner to fulfill a cherished desire.

- Kirill Zaytsev as Captain Prince Arkady Trubetskoy, an officer of the Guard Department
- Yura Borisov as Alexey Tarasov, the leader of the pickpocketing Ice Gang

Alex is a marxist who justifies his crimes by the fact that he steals from the rich, thus expropriating what was expropriated from the poor.

- Aleksei Guskov as Minister Nikolai Nikolaevich Vyazemsky of the Government of the Russian Empire, and Alisa Vyazemskaya's father
- Severija Janusauskaite as Severina Genrikhovna, Alisa's stepmother
- Yuri Kolokolnikov as Grand prince/duke Konstantin Alekseevich
- Timofey Tribuntsev as Pyotr Polyakov (English: Petr), a lamplighter, Matvey Polyakov's father
- Alexandra Revenko as Margo, Alex's girlfriend
- Vasily Kopeikin as Mukha (English: Muha), an ice skating pickpocket who is the strongman of the gang
- Mikhail Shelomentsev as Graf, a member of the gang disguised as a tea seller
- Bato Shoinjonov as Genghis, the Yakutian member of the gang of a few words
- Sergey Koltakov as Dmitri Mendeleev
- Cathy Belton as Miss Jackson, Alisa's governess
- Margarita Adaeva as Praskovia, Alisa's maid
- Denis Lavant as Fourier, an illusionist
- Dmitry Lysenkov as Doctor Grigoriy Anatoliyevich (English: Grigory)
- Valery Kukhareshin as a senior chef at Le Grand Pie
- Sergey Barkovsky as the principal of the Bestuzhev Courses
- Denis Pyanov as Aleksander Ivanovich, a policeman (English: Alexander)
- Elena Rufanova as Princess Trubetskaya, mother of Prince Arkady Trubetskoy
- Vasily Shchipitsyn as a policeman at the crossroads from the Saint Petersburg Police

== Production ==
=== Development ===
The source of inspiration for producer Petr Anurov may have been the title of the book of the famous novel of the same name by the Dutch-American writer Mary Mapes Dodge. While the book and the movie share a name and include silver skates and a sick father, they tell completely unrelated stories.

"These were very difficult half a year of my life, but the memories from the filming were only positive! We have a team of amazing professionals who are incredibly dedicated to the cinema, so even the weekly night shifts with frost and blizzard were surprisingly easy, in a creative atmosphere."

— directed by Michael Lockshin

The film was the feature debut of director Michael Lockshin, who had previously directed shorts and commercials.

=== Casting ===
Relatively unknown actors were cast in the main roles; the project was the first major film work for Fedotov and Priss, who are both from Saint Petersburg.

The actors had to go through sports training for the figure skating demands of the roles. Fedotov had been playing ice hockey from the age of three, but had to learn the different skating style during three months of intensive training. Almost all the stunts in the film were performed by Fedotov. The film also involved understudies (professional skaters) and stuntmen.

The film stars Aleksei Guskov, Yuri Kolokolnikov, Severija Janusauskaite, Kirill Zaytsev, Yuri Borisov, Alexandra Revenko, Timofey Tribuntsev, Sergey Koltakov, and also actors from European cinema, like Denis Lavant and Cathy Belton.

=== Filming ===
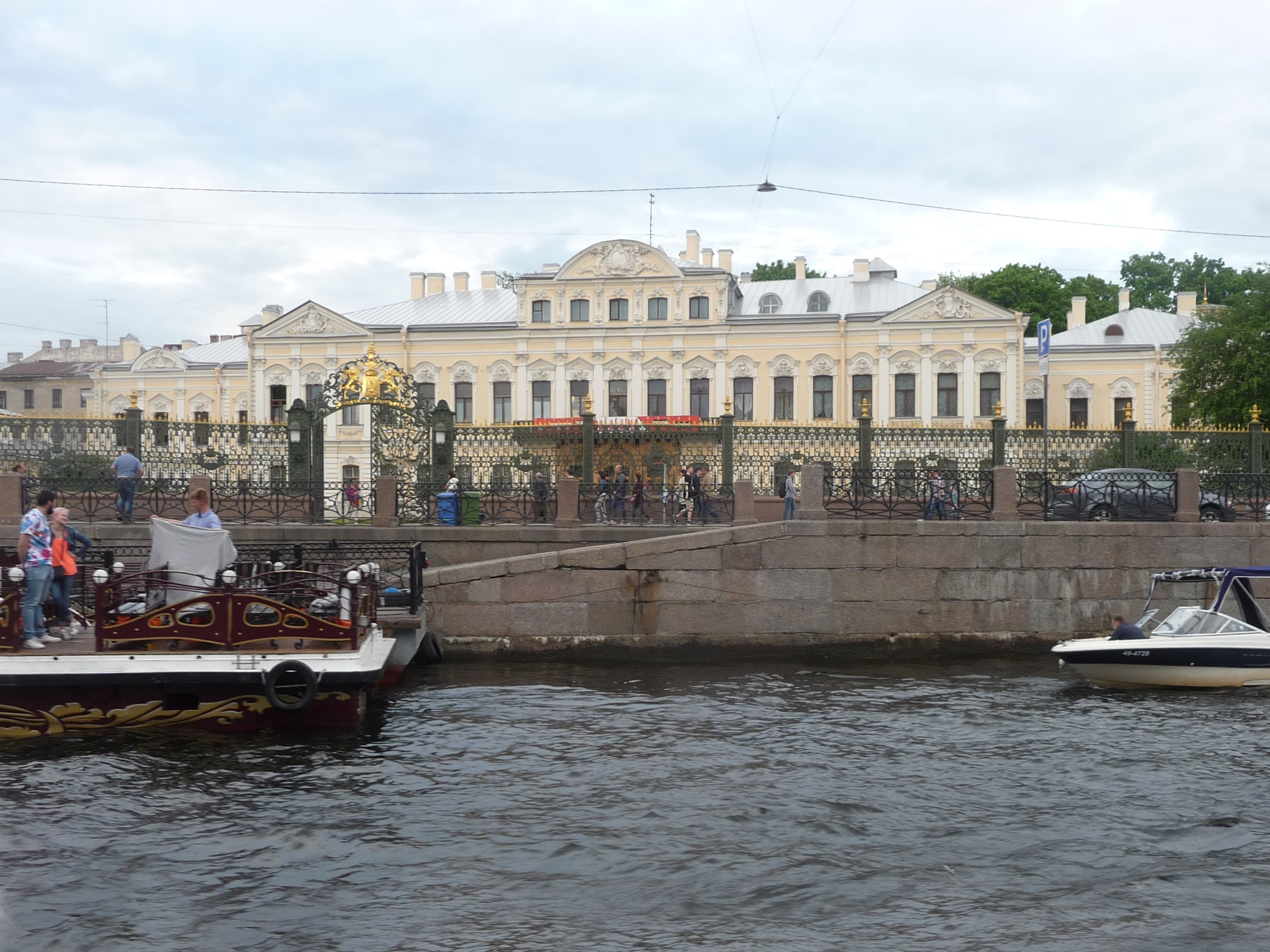
The Fountain House on the Fontanka Embankment was used for Alisa's family estate.

Vast amounts of scenery were created for the film, taken from a 10,000-square-metre (110,000 sq ft) warehouse and installed on special structures on the Great Neva by emergency response personnel.

Skates based on historical models were custom made for the film, as well as carriages, sleighs and cars of the period. Jewelry used in the film was rented from Garrard & Co and kept under guard.

Principal photography was undertaken from January to May 2019. Locations in Saint Petersburg include the Peter and Paul Fortress, the Grand prince with a passage of the Saint Michael's Castle, Vitebsky railway station, and the Stieglitz Museum of Applied Arts. Scenes were also shot in Leningrad Oblast, such as at Great Gatchina Palace in the town of Gatchina. Interior scenes were filmed in Yusupov Palace, Marble Palace, Sheremetev Palace (Fountain House), as well as in the Vladimir Palace (House of Scientists).

Most of the filming took place on the frozen rivers and canals of the bridges in Saint Petersburg, and comprise the largest collection of such footage. The film crew built and decorated ice fairs and skating rinks, and when the spring of 2019 began to come into its own, a large-scale decoration of the frozen Moyka River was built in the pavilion to shoot action scenes on ice.

=== Post-production ===
The computer graphics for the project were handled by Alexander Gorokhov's CGF visual effects studio.

About 200 specialists took part in the work on visual effects. CGF specialists filmed and scanned the center of St. Petersburg with a special camera so that in the scenes filmed in the pavilion against the background of a chroma key, real architectural objects could be built in post-production.

== Controversy ==
The film was called "scandalous" by journalists because of the initiation of a case by Rosprirodnadzor (Federal Service for Supervision of Natural Resources). The residents of St. Petersburg were initially surprised to see how public utilities cleared snow from the ice at the Moyka River, Kryukov Canal and Griboyedov Canal were covered with blue wooden slabs and film studio agents appeared nearby.

== Music ==
The Silver Skates (Original Motion Picture Soundtrack)

Soundtrack album by Guy Farley
- Released: December 18, 2020
- Recorded: 2020
- Studio: Abbey Road Studios
- Genre: Film score
- Length: 1:05:09
- Languages: English, Russian
- Label: MovieScore Media
- Director: Michael Lockshin

The original film soundtrack was composed by Guy Farley and recorded by the London Symphony Orchestra at Abbey Road Studios, is composed of 24 numbers, 2 of which directly quote the famous piano piece Moonlight by Claude Debussy, arranged for orchestra.

The film also uses fragments of works by Johann Sebastian Bach's Fugue g-moll BWV 578, String Quartet No. 3 (Part III) and String Quartet No. 51 op. 64 No. 4 (Part I) by Joseph Haydn, Nocturne No. 13 H 60 by John Field, Piano Sonata No. 2 WWV 21 (Part II) by Richard Wagner, The Skaters' Waltz by Emil Waldteifel.

The Final Waltz from the ballet The Nutcracker by Pyotr Tchaikovsky, Scene with dances from the Prologue of the ballet The Sleeping Beauty. The waltz – Tales from the Vienna Woods and Roses from the South by Johann Strauss the Son. Russian Easter Festival Overture, Op. 36; The dance of buffoons from the opera The Snow Maiden by Nikolai Rimsky-Korsakov.

=== Track listing ===
No.	Title	Length
1.	"The Grand Bakery"	3:15
2.	"Ice Skating (Clair De Lune)"	2:57
3.	"The Palace"	1:56
4.	"Alice Studies (Alisa Studies)"	1:46
5.	"Ice Gang"	2:21
6.	"Secrets and Earrings"	3:45
7.	"Miss Jackson"	2:15
8.	"The Art of Stealing"	2:12
9.	"A Guilded Cage"	2:15
10.	"Ice Revellers"	3:45
11.	"Awakening"	1:10
12.	"The Sting"	2:30
13.	"Spiritual World"	5:28
14.	"Arkady's Fight"	3:14
15.	"Father"	1:48
16.	"Alice Escapes (Alisa Escapes)"	1:59
17.	"Ice Hustle"	2:46
18.	"Surrounded"	2:47
19.	"Alive"	3:46
20.	"Palace Escape"	2:49
21.	"Jump for Your Life"	2:40
22.	"The Wedding"	3:13
23.	"Family"	1:47
24.	"Love Theme"	2:45
Total length:		65:09

== Release ==
=== Marketing ===
First teaser poster in English.

The first teaser trailer of The Silver Skates was released on June 19, 2019. The second trailer was released on October 10, 2019.

=== Theatrical ===
The film was initially scheduled to be released in early February 2020. After being postponed by six months, The Silver Skates premiered as the opening film of the 42nd Moscow International Film Festival in October 2020, where Nikita Mikhalkov is the president.

The Silver Skates had a special screening on December 3, 2020, at the Alexandrinsky Theatre in Saint Petersburg, and its world premiere was held on December 8, at the Karo October 11 cinema center on New Arbat Avenue in Moscow. It is scheduled to be theatrically released in the Russian Federation on December 10, 2020, by the Central Partnership, domestically representing the international distributor Paramount Pictures.

The film has been converted for IMAX theatres using digital media re-mastering technology.

== Reception ==
=== Critical response ===
The film received high marks in the Russian press; according to aggregators, there were no negative reviews at all. "The full-length debut of director Michael Lockshin was definitely a success," Valery Kichin writes in Russian Gazette. Many of the critics have highlighted the vintage aesthetics, the film's dreamlike atmosphere and music. Anton Dolin in Meduza also noted the social subtext of the plot: "The central conflict of the Silver Skates – it seems for the first time in the domestic film mainstream – is associated with the liberation of the heroine from the bonds of patriarchy." Some authors have compared The Silver Skates to Titanic, noting plot parallels.

The Silver Skates has only 6 reviews on review aggregator website Rotten Tomatoes; no known english-speaking critics reviewed the film.

=== Audience response ===
The movie was No.1 on Netflix in multiple territories in South America and Europe for many weeks.

On IMDB the film has a 7.1 rating.

=== Accolades ===
Award	Date of ceremony	Category	Recipient(s)	Result	Ref.
9th Russian Film and Television Producers Awards	March 26, 2021	Best Feature Film of 2020	The Silver Skates	Won	
33rd Nika Awards	April 25, 2021	Best Supporting Actor	Yuri Borisov (actor)	Nominated	
33rd Nika Awards	April 25, 2021	Best Cinematographer	Igor Grinyakin	Nominated	
33rd Nika Awards	April 25, 2021	Best Production Designer	Aleksandr Zagoskin	Won	
33rd Nika Awards	April 25, 2021	Best Costume Designer	Tatiana Patrakhaltseva and Galina Solodovnikova	Won	
33rd Nika Awards	April 25, 2021	Best Film Editing	Maria Likhacheva and Dmitry Slobtsov	Won	
33rd Nika Awards	April 25, 2021	Discovery of the Year	Michael Lockshin (film director)	Nominated	
Russian Guild of Film Critics presents White Elephant Awards	April 10, 2021	Best Production Designer	Aleksandr Zagoskin, Tatiana Patrakhaltseva and Galina Solodovnikova	Won	
20th Golden Eagle Awards	January 28, 2022	Best Motion Picture	The Silver Skates	Won	
20th Golden Eagle Awards	January 28, 2022	Best Director	Michael Lockshin (director)	Nominated	
20th Golden Eagle Awards	January 28, 2022	Best Screenplay	Roman Kantor	Won	
20th Golden Eagle Awards	January 28, 2022	Best Supporting Actress	Severija Janusauskaite	Nominated	
20th Golden Eagle Awards	January 28, 2022	Best Supporting Actor	Aleksei Guskov	Nominated	
20th Golden Eagle Awards	January 28, 2022	Best Cinematography	Igor Grinyakin	Won	
20th Golden Eagle Awards	January 28, 2022	Best Art Direction	Aleksandr Zagoskin	Won	
20th Golden Eagle Awards	January 28, 2022	Best Costume Design	Tatiana Patrakhaltseva and Galina Solodovnikova	Won	
20th Golden Eagle Awards	January 28, 2022	Best Makeup and Plastic Special Effects	Tamara Frid	Nominated	
20th Golden Eagle Awards	January 28, 2022	Best Film Editing	Maria Likhacheva and Dmitry Slobtsov	Won	
20th Golden Eagle Awards	January 28, 2022	Best Visual Effects	CGF is a company	Nominated	
20th Golden Eagle Awards	January 28, 2022	Best Sound Engineer	Aleksey Samodelko	Nominated	

== See also ==
- List of Christmas films
