= Torgovy Bridge =

Torgovy Bridge Торговый мост
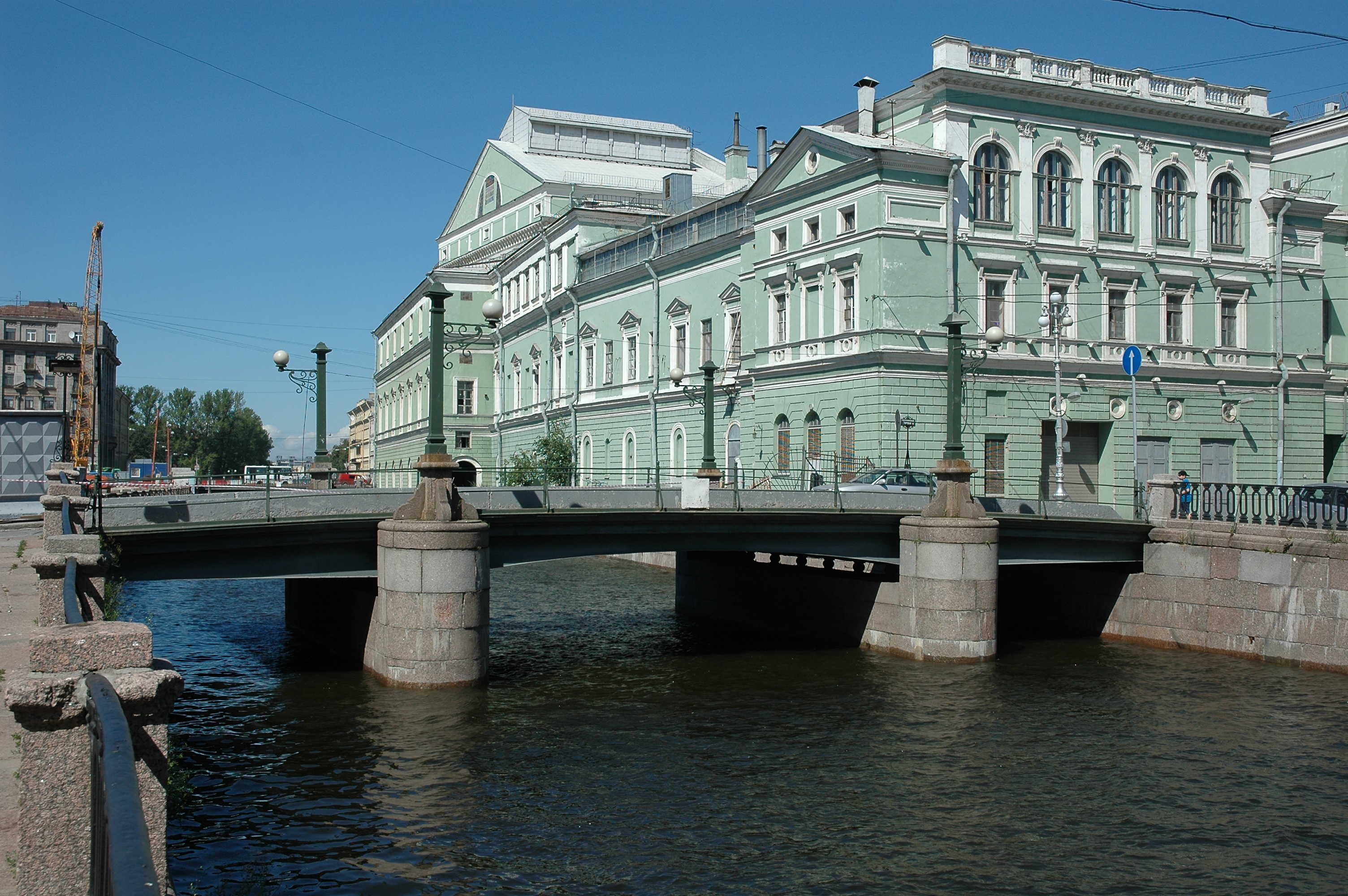
- Coordinates: 59°55′28″N 30°17′44″E
- Crosses: Kryukov Canal
- Locale: Admiralteysky District, Saint Petersburg
- Heritage status: Cultural heritage of the peoples of the Russian Federation, Regional importance, Monument of urban planning and architecture
- Registry number: 781710970930005

Characteristics
- Design: Girder
- Material: Steel
- Total length: 24 (26.7) м
- Width: 10.5 м
- Traversable?: Automobiles, pedestrians

History
- Opened: 1785
- Rebuilt: 1810, 1868, 1905, 1946–1947, 1960–1961

Torgovy Bridge is a steel girder bridge across the Kryukov Canal in the Admiralteysky District of Saint Petersburg, Russia. The bridge connects the Kolomensky and Kazansky Islands. The bridge has retained the architectural appearance that is characteristic of the bridges of the Kryukov Canal during the 1780s. Torgovy Bridge is a monument of history and culture.

== Location ==
Torgovy bridge connects Teatralnaya Ploshchad and the street Soyuza Pechatnikov.

Mariinsky Theater is located next to the bridge.

Upstream is the Dekabristov Bridge, and below is the Kashin Bridge.

The nearest metro stations are Sadovaya, Sennaya Ploschad, and Spasskaya.

== Name ==
The name of the bridge is derived from the former name of the street Soyuza Pechatnikov, which was Torgovoy. In the newspaper "Sankt-Peterburgskie Vedomosti" the name Sredny Bridge was recorded in 1797, however, since 1798, the street name Torgovy was established instead.

== History ==
Torgovy Bridge was built in 1783–1785 according to the standard design for the bridges of the Kryukov Canal: a three-span wooden bridge on supports of rubble masonry, faced with granite, the central span was movable, the side ones were girders. The author of the project is unknown, the work was carried out by the contractor Nikolai Egorov. In 1805–1810, the drawbridge span structure was replaced. In 1868, the bridge was overhauled.

By the end of the 1890s, the bridge was in an unsatisfactory state. Since 1896, the city council had repeatedly sent requests to the Duma to allocate funds for the overhaul of the Torgovoy Bridge. The magazine "Nedelya stroitelya" reported in 1900 that the carriage traffic on the bridge was closed and the council planned to rebuild the bridge into a single-span concrete bridge. In 1905, after the collapse of the Egyptian Bridge, the Duma allocated funds to repair the bridge. In the summer of 1905, the wooden girders of the bridge were replaced with metal I-beams, and the masonry of the abutments was fixed. Technical supervision of construction work was carried out by engineer P. A. Likhachev.

In 1946–1947, due to the thawing of the supports and damage to the granite cladding, the supports were partially shifted. In 1960–1961 the bridge was overhauled according to the project of architect A. L. Rotach and engineer A. D. Gutsayt. New metal beams were laid for the superstructure. The wooden planks were replaced with a reinforced concrete slab. The street lights on the bridge were restored.

== Construction ==
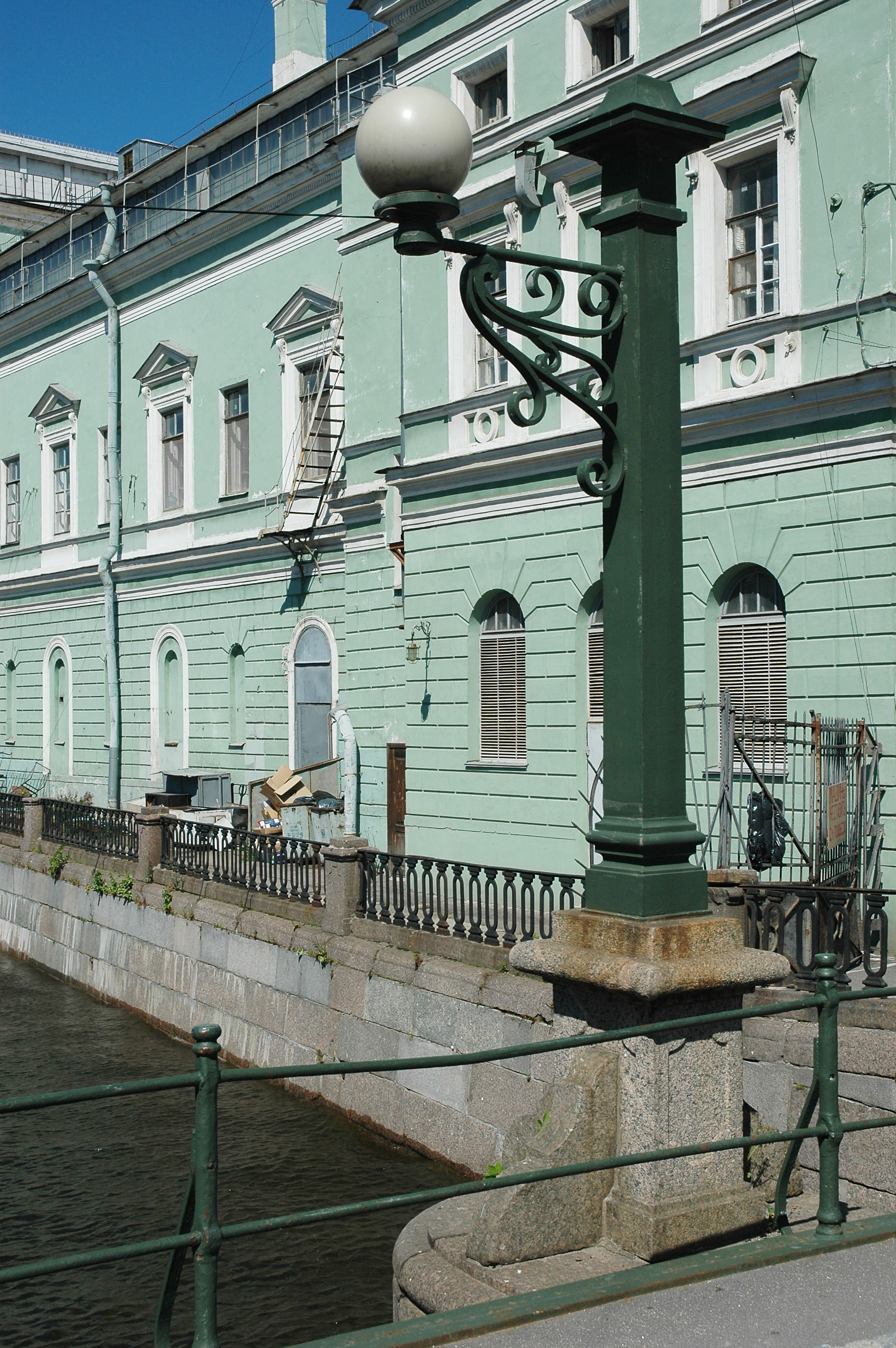
Torgovy Bridge Street Light

Torgovy Bridge is a three-span metal bridge. It has a continuous beam system. The breakdown of the spans is as follows: 6.45, 11.15, and 6.45 m. The superstructure consists of steel I-beams with a curvilinear silhouette on the lower portion. It is united by transverse beams. A reinforced concrete slab is arranged on top of the beams. The supports are made of rubble masonry with massive granite cladding. The total width of the bridge is 10.5 m. The length of the bridge is 24 (26.7) m.

The bridge is intended for the movement of vehicles and pedestrians. The carriageway of the bridge includes 2 lanes for traffic. The roadway and sidewalks are covered with asphalt concrete. The sidewalks are separated from the roadway by a high concrete parapet. The railing is metal. There are 4 street lights of artistic casting.

== Eponym ==
On 29 April 2005, the Torgovy Bridge tanker, serial number 02743, was launched at the Admiralty Shipyard. The tanker is the fourth ship in a series built at the shipyards for Sovcomflot (Open Joint Stock Company).

== Torgovy Bridge in literature ==
The bridge is mentioned in a novel, "Humiliated and Insulted" by Fyodor Dostoevsky.

"It was not long to go, to the Torgovy Bridge. We were silent for the first minute. I kept thinking: will he somehow talk to me? ... But he spoke without any subterfuge and got down to business."

== See also ==
- List of Bridges in Saint Petersburg
