= Kashin Bridge =

Bridge in Admiralteysky, Saint Petersburg, Russia

Kashin Bridge Кашин мост
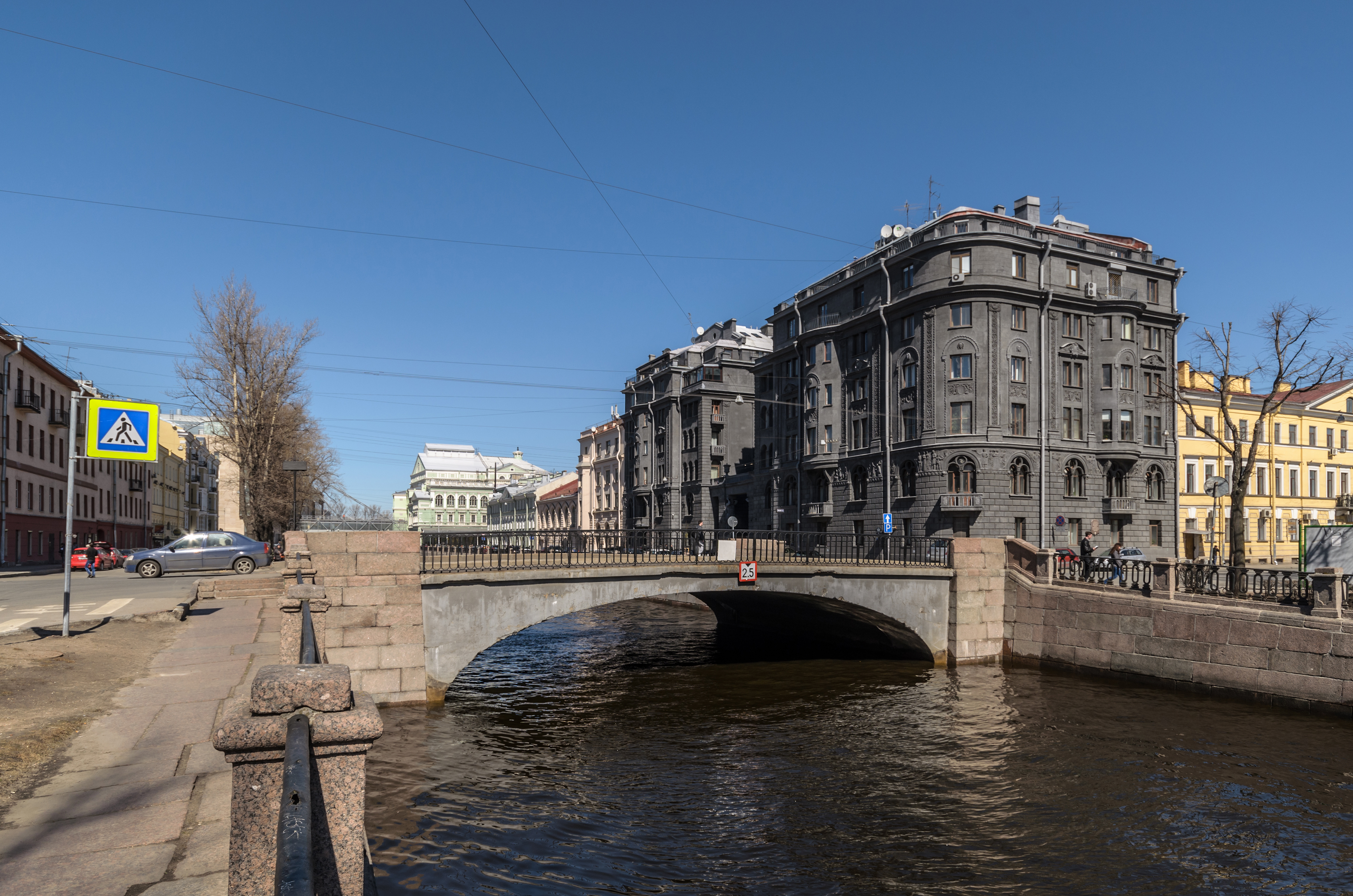
- Coordinates: 59°55′23″N 30°17′49″E
- Crosses: Kryukov Canal
- Locale: Admiralteysky District, Saint Petersburg

Characteristics
- Design: Hingeless vault
- Material: Reinforced concrete
- Total length: 23.9 м
- Width: 16 м
- Traversable?: Automobiles, pedestrians

History
- Opened: 1787
- Rebuilt: 1839–1840, 1863, 1876, 1931–1932

Location
- Interactive map of Kashin Bridge

The Kashin Bridge is a hingeless vault bridge across the Kryukov Canal in the Admiralteysky District of Saint Petersburg, Russia. The bridge connects Kolomensky and Kazansky Islands.

== Location ==
Kashin Bridge is located along the axis of Rimsky-Korsakov Avenue.

Nikolsky Cathedral is located near the bridge.

Upstream is the Staro-Nikolsky Bridge, and below is the Torgovy Bridge.

The nearest metro stations are Sadovaya, Sennaya Ploschad, and Spasskaya.

== Name ==
Since 1789, the bridge was called Nikolayevsky or Nikolsky after the nearby Nikolsky Cathedral. Since 1795, the bridge began to be called Kashin after the nearby Kashin Tavern which bore the family name of its landlord.

== History ==
Kashin Bridge was built in 1783–1787 according to the standard design for the bridges of the Kryukov Canal. It was a three-span wooden bridge on supports of rubble masonry, and it was faced with granite. The central span was movable, the side ones were girders. The author of the project is unknown.

In 1839–1840, the drawbridge was replaced with a permanent bridge. In 1863, the bridge was overhauled without changing the structure. In 1876, the bridge was rebuilt and broadened by 1.5 m to accommodate a tram line. Beginning in 1898, the city government proposed to replace the wooden bridge spans with iron riveted beams (as on the Torgovy or Matveyev bridges), but the project was not implemented.

In 1930, due to damage of the masonry and granite facing in the underwater part of the bridge, as well as the granite embankment wall adjacent to the bridge, it was decided to rebuild the bridge. In 1931–1932, a single-span arched bridge with a solid reinforced concrete vault was built. The bridge project was developed by the design department (architect K. M. Dmitriev, engineer F. K. Kuznetsov) of the Bridges and Embankments Trust. The construction work was supervised by engineers P. P. Stepnov and P. A. Zhukov.

== Construction ==
Kashin Bridge is a one-span hingeless arch bridge with a solid reinforced concrete vault. The abutments of the bridge are made of monolithic reinforced concrete on a pile foundation, and are faced with granite. The pillars are extended from the embankment line into the channel. The total width of the bridge is 16 m, the length of the bridge is 23.9 m.

The bridge is intended for the movement of vehicles and pedestrians. The carriageway of the bridge includes 2 lanes for traffic. The surface of the roadway and sidewalks is asphalt concrete. The sidewalks are separated from the roadway by a high granite curb. The railings are made of metal, with a simple pattern. Staircases were added for the transition from the sidewalks of the bridge to the level of the embankments.

== See also ==
- List of bridges in Saint Petersburg
