= Staro-Nikolsky Bridge =

Staro-Nikolsky Bridge Старо-Никольский мост
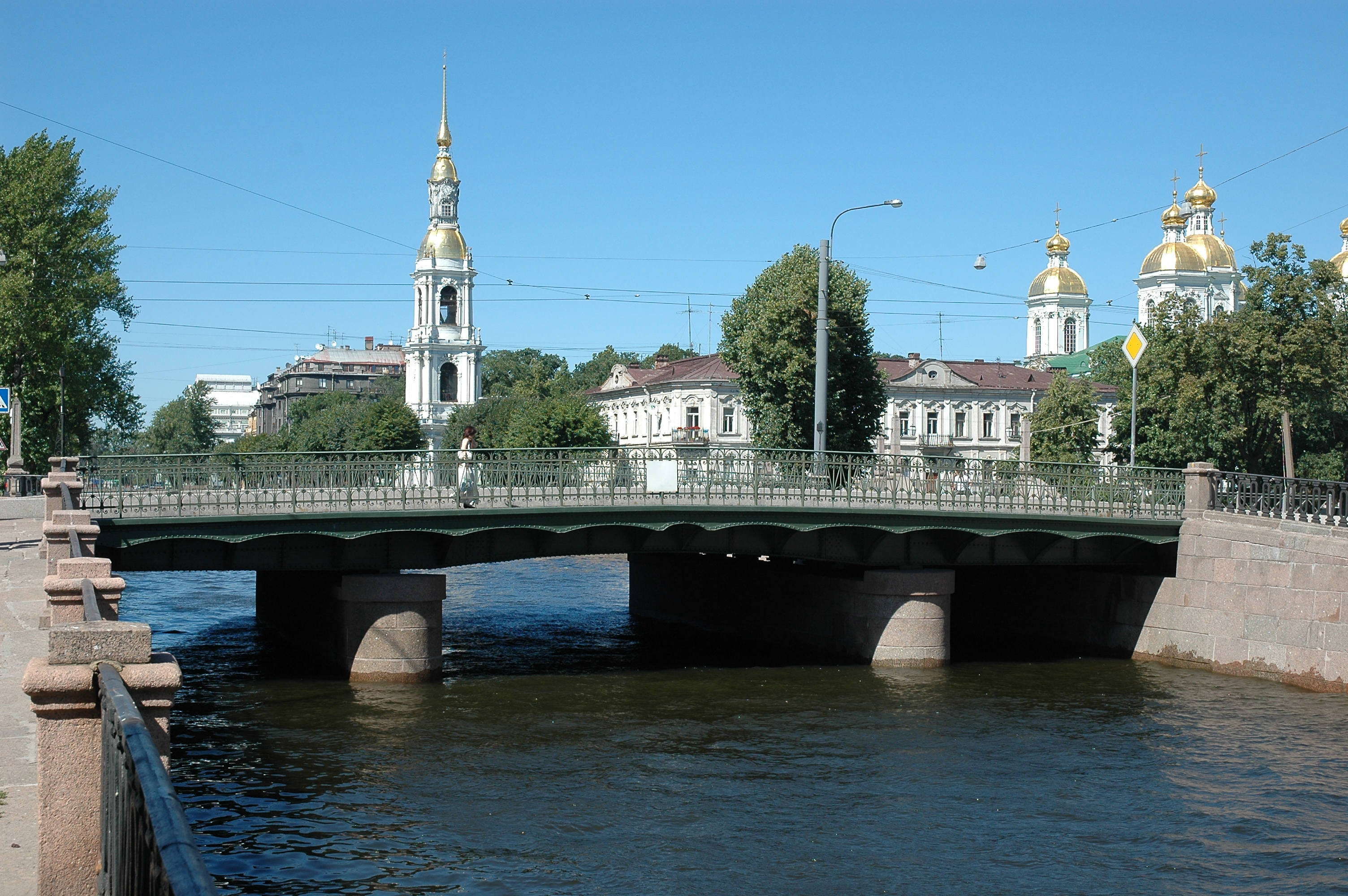
- Coordinates: 59°55′14″N 30°17′56″E
- Crosses: Kryukov Canal
- Locale: Admiralteysky District, Saint Petersburg
- Heritage status: Cultural heritage of the peoples of the Russian Federation, Regional importance, Monument of urban planning and architecture
- Registry number: 781710972050005

Characteristics
- Design: Girder
- Material: Steel
- Total length: 24.3 (28) м
- Width: 20.2 м
- Traversable?: Trams, automobiles, pedestrians

History
- Opened: 1720
- Rebuilt: 1786, 1887, 1905–1906, 2003–2004

Staro-Nikolsky Bridge spans the Kryukov Canal in the Admiralteysky District of Saint Petersburg, Russia. It connects the Spassky and Pokrovsky Islands. It is a monument of history and culture.

== Location ==
It is located along the axis of Sadovaya Street, at the intersection of the Kryukov Canal and the Griboyedov Canal. The Staro-Nikolsky Bridge forms an ensemble with the Pikalov and Krasnogvardeysky bridges that span the Griboyedov Canal nearby.

Nikolsky Market and Nikolsky Cathedral are located near the bridge.

Upstream is Kashin Bridge, below is Smezhny Bridge.

The nearest metro stations are Sadovaya, Sennaya Ploschad, and Spasskaya.

== Name ==
The bridge is named after the nearby Nikolsky Cathedral. Initially, the bridge was called Nikolsky. However, in 1849, after the nearby bridge across the Catherine Canal began to be called Novo-Nikolsky, the bridge over the Kryukov Canal was named Old Nikolsky or Staro-Nikolsky.

== History ==
From 1717 to 1720, a wooden bridge existed on this site. In 1784–1786, the bridge was rebuilt according to the standard design for the bridges of the Kryukov Canal. It was a three-span wooden bridge on rubble masonry supports, that were faced with granite. The author of the project is unknown. During the 19th century, the bridge was repaired several times: the central drawbridge was replaced by a permanent one, in 1842 new railings were installed.

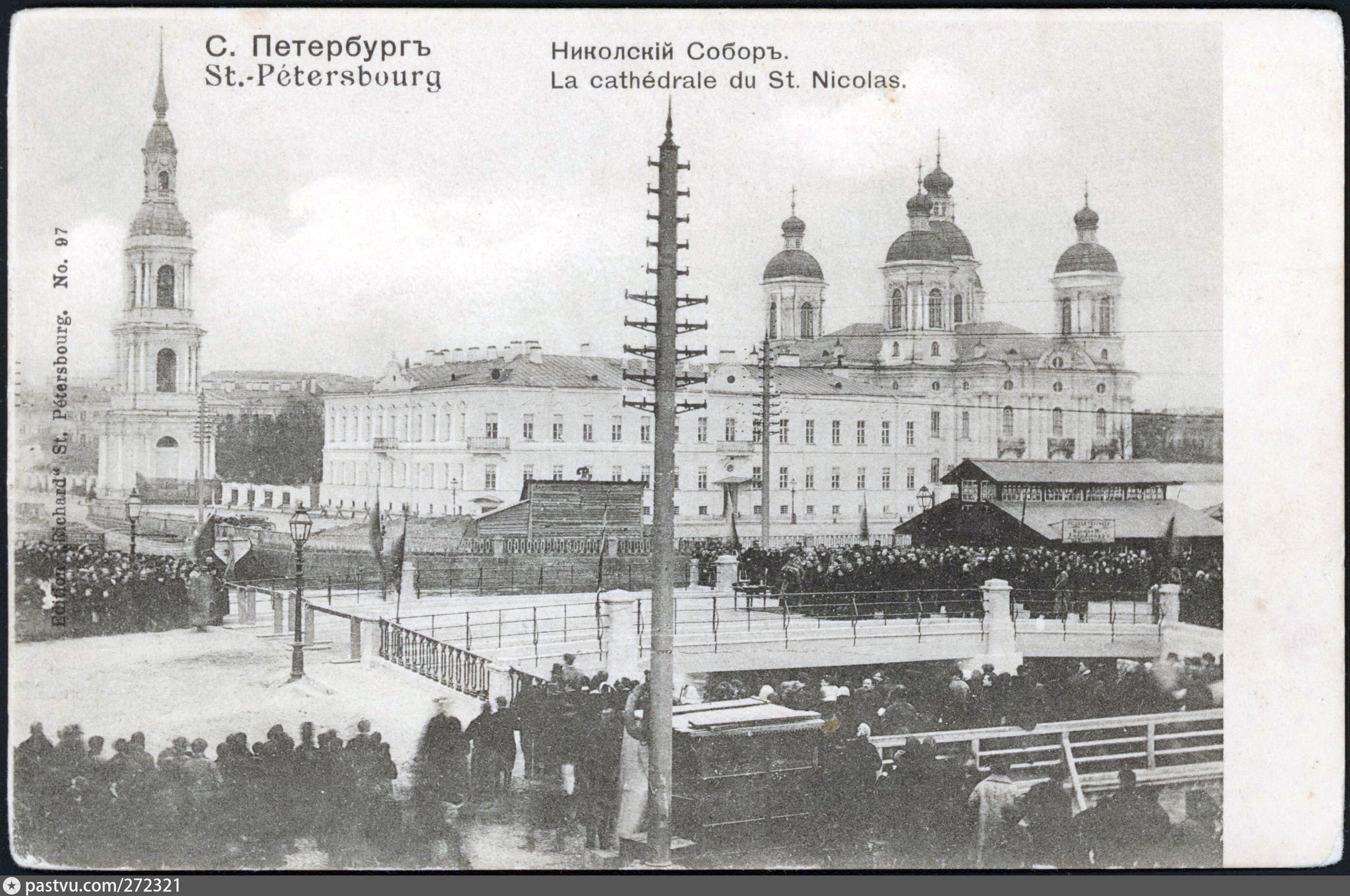
Opening of bridge after repairs in 1887

In 1887, the bridge was overhauled to lay a tram line along it. The foundations and supports were shifted. The work on the shifting of the supports was carried out in a dry pit. On 11 October 1887, the bridge was formally opened in the presence of the mayor, and members of the Council, who, after the consecration of the bridge, made a test run in a horse-drawn carriage.

In 1905–1906, in connection with the planned opening of tram traffic along Sadovaya Street, the bridge was rebuilt according to the project of engineers A.P. Pshenitsky, K.V. Efimiev, and V.A. Bers. The pillars of the bridge were shifted and widened. The wooden beams of the span structure were replaced with metal ones. The retaining walls of the embankment adjacent to the bridge were thickened. The bridge width increased from 13.6 to 20.2 m. New railings were also installed.

At the time of the work, a temporary pedestrian bridge was erected. The reconstruction of the bridge was carried out by contractors Petrov, Yurensky, Kachurin and Rzheshevsky from December 1905 to 15 September 1906. The bridge was accepted and tested on 21 September 1906. Technical supervision of construction works was carried out by engineer A.P. Pshenitsky. The cost of the work was 65,177 rubles.

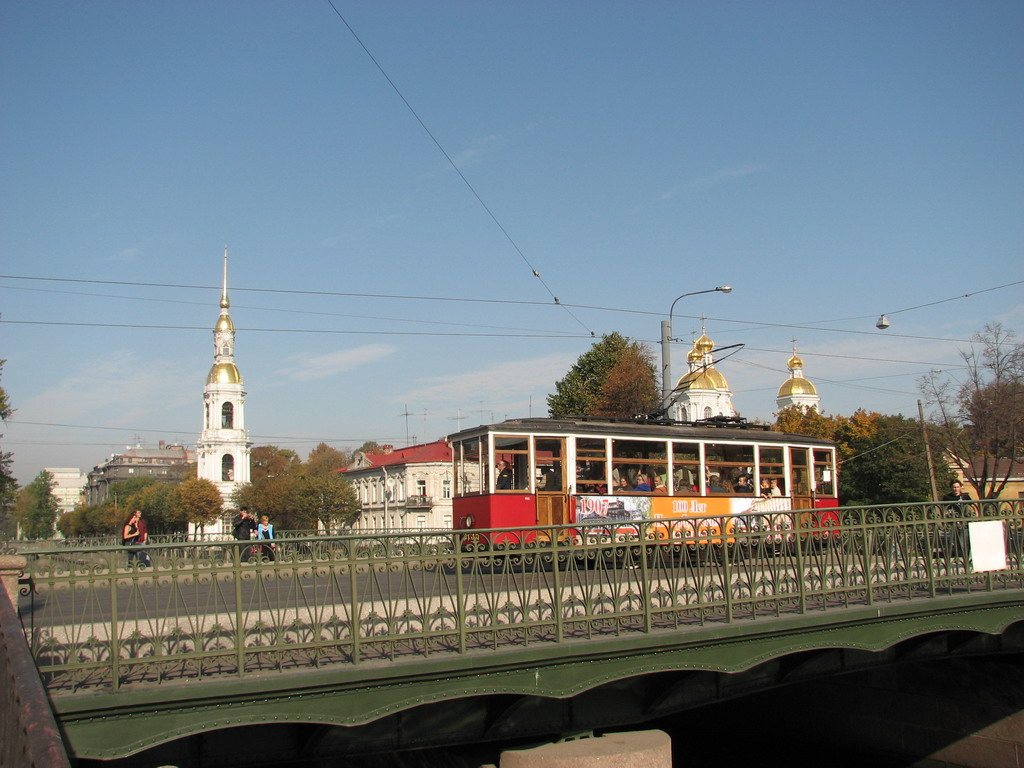
Tram MS-2 on Staro-Nikolsky Bridge

In 1988, the diabase paving was replaced with asphalt concrete. In 1994–1995, the cornices, sidewalk and part of the span structure were repaired.

By the end of the 1990s, a need for the repair and reconstruction of the bridge arose due to the unsatisfactory state of the span structures. The client for the job was the Saint Petersburg Administration's Development Committee for the Highway Sector, and the main contractor providing services was Rizalit LLC. Work began in December 2003. At the time of the work, a temporary pedestrian bridge was erected. On Staro-Nikolsky Bridge, a reinforced concrete slab was installed at the base of the carriageway, the supports of the bridge were strengthened, new roadway cover was laid with replacement tram tracks, and the railings were restored. In addition, the strengthening and restoration of the granite lining of the adjacent sections of the Kryukov Canal embankment was also carried out. On 21 October 2004, after the renovations, the bridge was accepted by the state commission.

== Construction ==
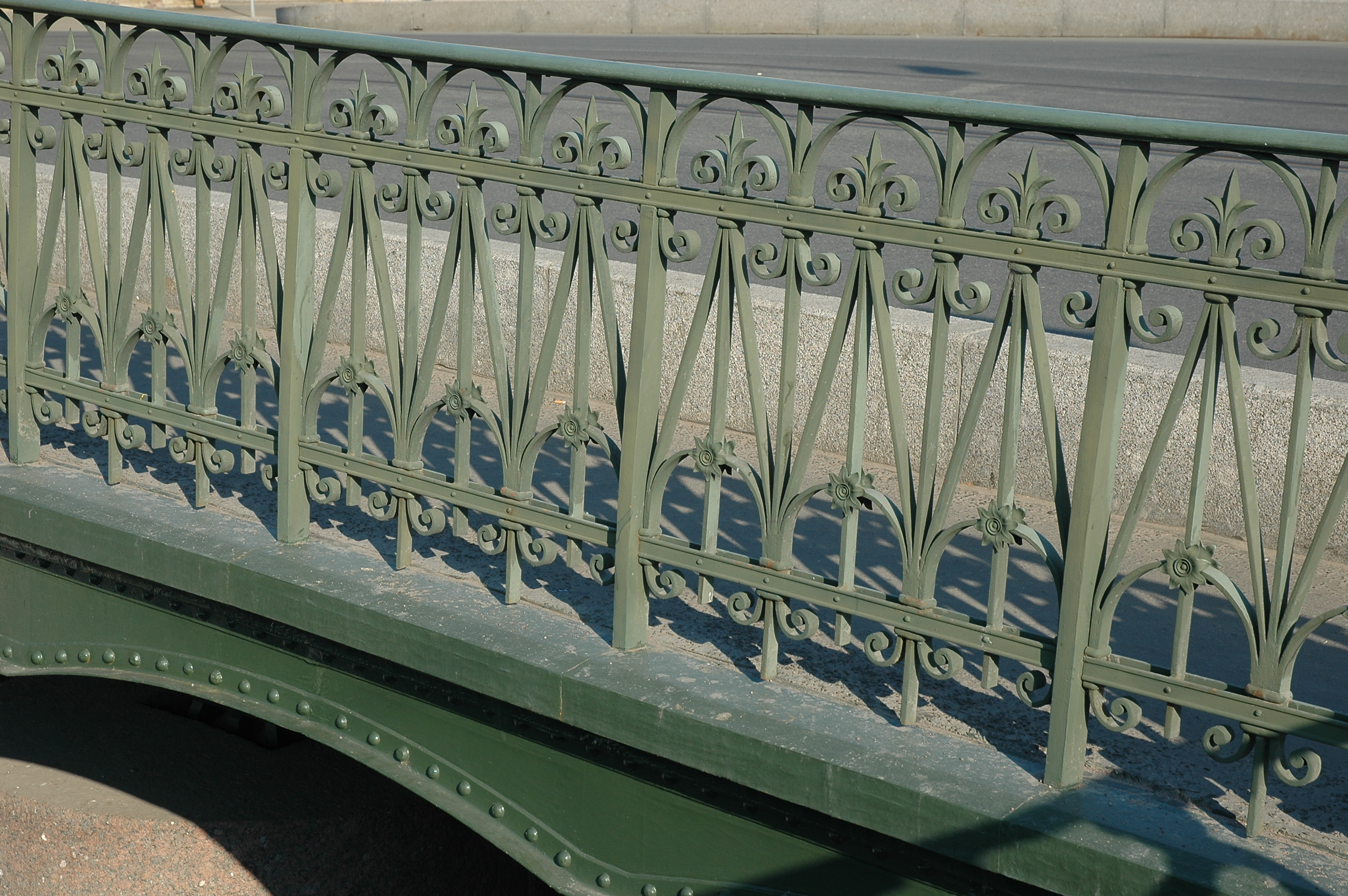
The railing of the Staro-Nikolsky bridge

Staro-Nikolsky Bridge is a three-span metal bridge with a continuous beam system. It breaks down into the following spans: 5.95, 11.16, 5.95 m. The superstructure consists of 8 steel I-beams with a curvilinear silhouette, and is united by transverse beams. The distance between the axes of the main beams is 2.45 m; the distance of the cross beams is 1.1 m. The bottom of the beams in the middle span has a concave parabolic shape to increase the dimensions underneath the bridge. A reinforced concrete slab is arranged on top of the beams. The supports are made of rubble masonry with massive granite cladding. The total width of the bridge is 20.2 m (of which the width of the carriageway is 17 m and the two sidewalks are of 1.6 m each). The length of the bridge is 24.3 (28) m.

The bridge is intended for the movement of trams, vehicles and pedestrians. The carriageway of the bridge includes 4 lanes for traffic (including 2 tram lines). The surface of the roadway and sidewalks is asphalt concrete. The sidewalks are separated from the roadway by a high granite curb. Metal railings with artistic forging complete the granite pedestals and abutments.

== See also ==
- List of bridges in Saint Petersburg
