= Smezhny Bridge =

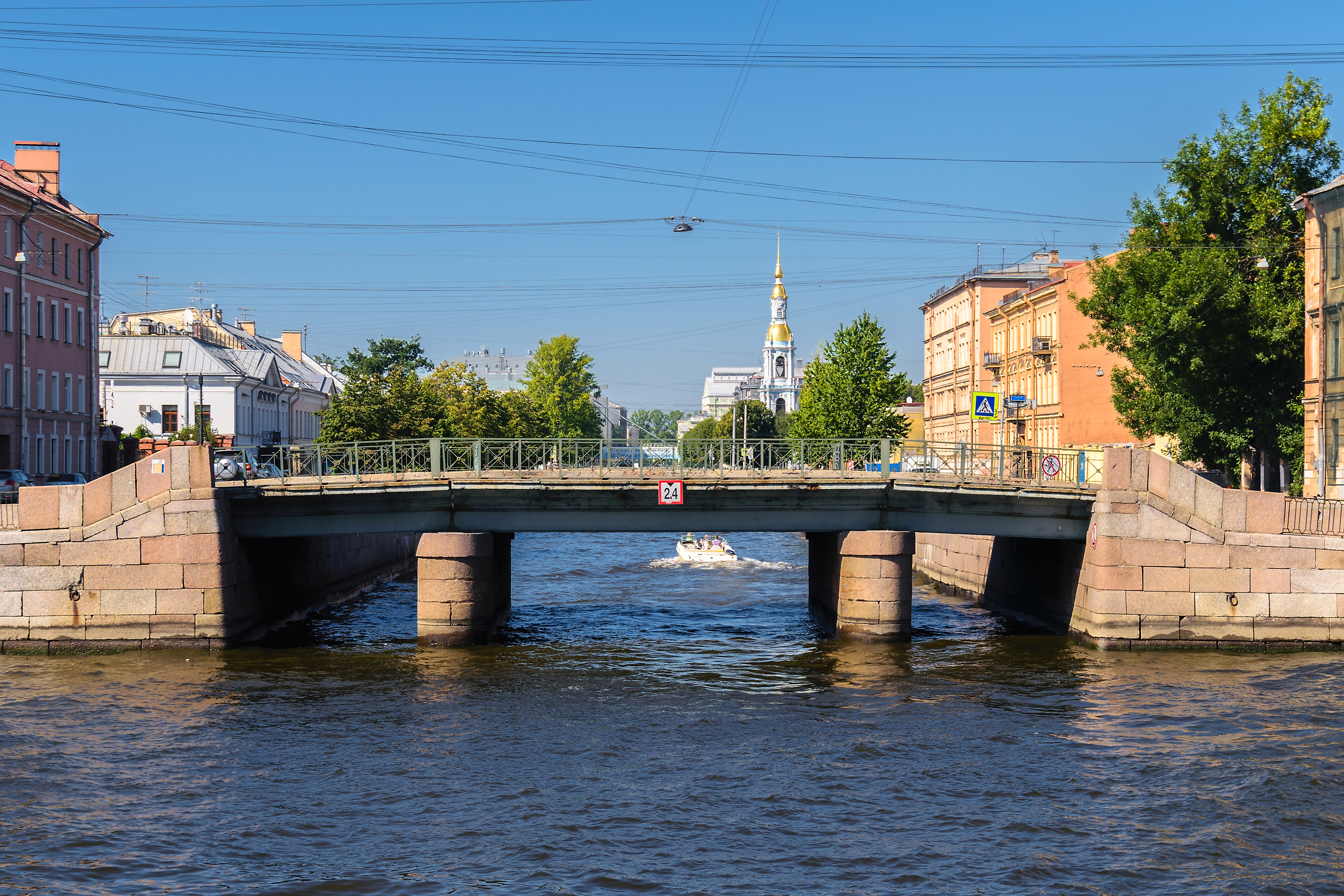
- Coordinates: 59°55′05″N 30°18′06″E
- Crosses: Kryukov Canal
- Locale: Admiralteysky District of Saint Petersburg

Characteristics
- Design: girder
- Total length: 24,1 м
- Width: 15,4 м
- Traversable?: automobile, pedestrian

History
- Opening: 1787

Location
- Interactive map of Smezhny Bridge

Smezhny Bridge is a bridge across the Kryukov Canal in the Admiralteysky District of Saint Petersburg that connects the Spassky and Pokrovsky Islands.

== Location ==
Smezhny Bridge is located along the odd (northern) Fontanka embankment, between house numbers 141 and 143, at the confluence of the Fontanka and Kryukov canal.

Upstream is Staro-Nikolsky Bridge.

The nearest metro station (1.3 km) is Tekhnologichesky Institute.

== Name ==
The name of the bridge has been well-known since 1820 and is associated with its location (it connects the Fontanka embankment across the Kryukov Canal). In the 19th century, the names "Nikolsky Naberezhny Bridge" (1821–1822) and "Connecting Bridge" (1849–1875) existed, since the bridge connected the Spassky and Kolomensky Islands.

== History ==
Smezhny bridge was built in 1782 – 1787, according to the standard design for bridges across the Kryukov Canal. It was a three-span wooden bridge on supports. It was faced with granite. The central span was movable, the side ones were girders. The author of the project is unknown.

In 1800 – 1810, the drawbridge span structure was replaced by a wooden girder. In 1867, the span structure was overhauled. In 1888, the wooden spans were replaced with metal ones, and the supports were moved. For this part, some of the Kryukov Canal water was pumped out and the work was carried out in a dry pit. During the repair of the bridge, a temporary bridge was built. In 1940, the span structure of the bridge was reinforced by welding horizontal metal sheets to the upper and lower shelves of the I-beams of the girders. At the same time, the three-span system and the general appearance of the bridge was preserved.

In 1964, the bridge was rebuilt according to the project of engineer E.E. Rosenfeld for laying heating pipes. The bridge spans were covered with high metal beams, which led to the distortion of the historical appearance of the bridge and the violation of the architectural unity with the adjacent sections of the embankments.

== Construction ==
The bridge is a three-span metal girder bridge. The superstructure consists of steel I-beams. Heat pipelines are stowed under the roadway slab. The intermediate supports of rubble masonry are lined with granite. The concrete abutments are on a pile foundation which is made of wooden piles with granite cladding. The total width of the bridge is 15.4 m, the length of the bridge is 24.1 m.

The bridge is designed for the movement of vehicles and pedestrians. The carriageway of the bridge includes 3 lanes for traffic. The roadway and sidewalks are covered with asphalt concrete. The sidewalks are separated from the carriageway by a high granite curb. The railings are made of metal and line the abutments and end at the granite parapets. There are stairs from the sidewalks of the bridge to the embankments.

== See also ==
- List of Bridges in Saint Petersburg

== Sources ==
- S. V. Alekseeva; A. G. Vladimirovich; A. D. Erofeev; et al., eds. (1997). Городские имена сегодня и вчера: Петербургская топонимика [City Names Today and Yesterday: Petersburg Toponymy] (in Russian) (2nd, revised and enlarged ed.). St. Petersburg: Lik. ISBN 5-86038-023-2.
- Novikov, Yu. V. (1991). P. P. Stepnov (ed.). Мосты и набережные Ленинграда [Bridges and embankments of Leningrad] (in Russian). Leningrad: Lenizdat.
- Tumilovich, E. V.; Altunin, S. E. (1963). Мосты и набережные Ленинграда. Альбом [Bridges and Embankments of Leningrad. Album] (in Russian). Moscow: Publishing House of the Ministry of Public Utilities of the RSFSR.
- Vladimirovich, A. G.; Erofeev, A. D. (2009). Петербург в названиях улиц [Petersburg in street names] (in Russian). Moscow: AST. ISBN 978-5-17-057482-7.
