= Matveevsky Bridge =

Bridge in Admiralteysky, Saint Petersburg, Russia

Matveevsky Bridge Матвеев мост
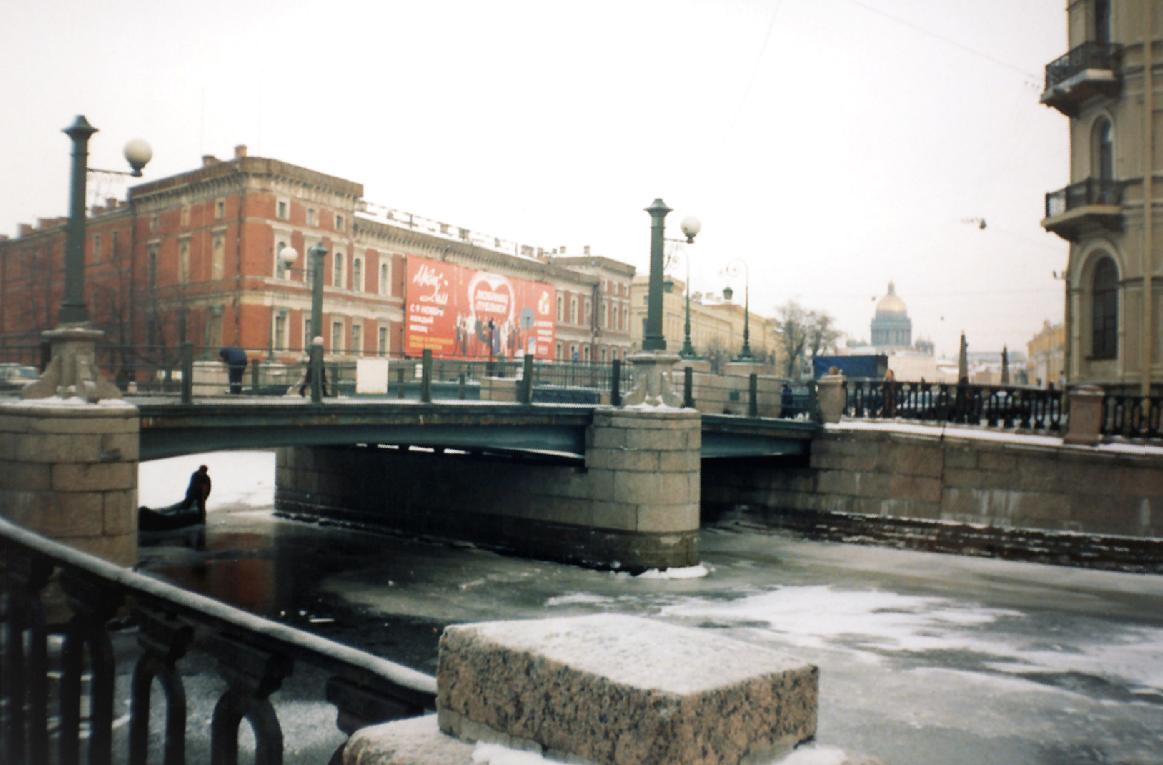
- Coordinates: 59°55′40″N 30°17′38″E
- Crosses: Kryukov Canal
- Locale: Admiralteysky District, Saint Petersburg
- Heritage status: Cultural heritage of the peoples of the Russian Federation, Regional importance, Monument of urban planning and architecture
- Registry number: 781710970910005

Characteristics
- Design: Girder
- Material: Steel
- Total length: 24.7 (27.1) m
- Width: 9.78 m
- Traversable?: Automobiles, pedestrians

History
- Opened: 1786
- Rebuilt: 1905, 1950

Matveevsky Bridge — is a steel girder bridge over the Kryukov Canal in the Admiralteysky District of Saint Petersburg, Russia. It connects the Kolomensky and Kazansky Islands. The bridge has retained the architectural appearance characteristic of the bridges of the Kryukov Canal during the 1780s. It is a monument of history and culture.

== Location ==
Matveevsky Bridge is located along the (southern) embankment of the Moyka River between houses No. 100 and 102, at the intersection of the Kryukov Canal and the Moyka River. It forms an ensemble with the nearby Krasnoflotsky Bridge across the Moyka River.

The Central Naval Museum (Kryukov Naval Barracks) and the New Holland Island are next to the bridge.

Downstream is the Decembrists' Bridge or the Dekabristov Bridge.

The nearest metro stations are Sadovaya, Sennaya Ploschad, and Spasskaya.

== Name ==
Since 1798, the Matveevsky Bridge was called "Konyushenny" because the embankment of the left bank of the Moyka River was then Konyushennaya Street. Since 1812, the bridge was called "Kanavsky," then "Kanalny" (1820–1875) or "Kanavny" (1836–1844) because in the 18th–19th centuries, Saint Petersburg canals were often called "kanavy" meaning ditches. In 1868, the bridge was called "Prison Bridge" because of the nearby city prison named Litovsky Zamok (Lithuanian Castle). Sometimes the bridge was also called "Litovsky" (Lithuanian). The prison was burned down during the February Revolution in 1917. In March 1919, the bridge was renamed the "Matveyev Bridge" in memory of the commissar, communist worker, and participant in the civil war S.M. Matveyev, who was killed in 1918 and buried in Kommunarov Square. The modern name remains "Matveev Bridge" or "Matveevsky Bridge."

== History ==
Matveevsky Bridge was built in 1784–1786 according to the standard design for the bridges of the Kryukov Canal. The design was a three-span wooden bridge on supports of rubble masonry that were faced with granite. The central span was movable. The side spans were girders. The author of the project is unknown. At the end of the 19th century, the movable span structure was replaced by a permanent one. In the summer of 1905, the wooden girders of the bridge were replaced with metal I-beams, and the masonry of the abutments was also fixed. Technical supervision of construction work was carried out by engineer P. A. Likhachev.

In 1950, the bridge was overhauled according to the project of architect T. V. Bersenyeva and engineers P. V. Andreevsky, and A. D. Gutsayt. All supports were rearranged, new metal beams were laid, and a reinforced concrete slab was added for the roadway. In 1954, the street lights were restored.

== Construction ==
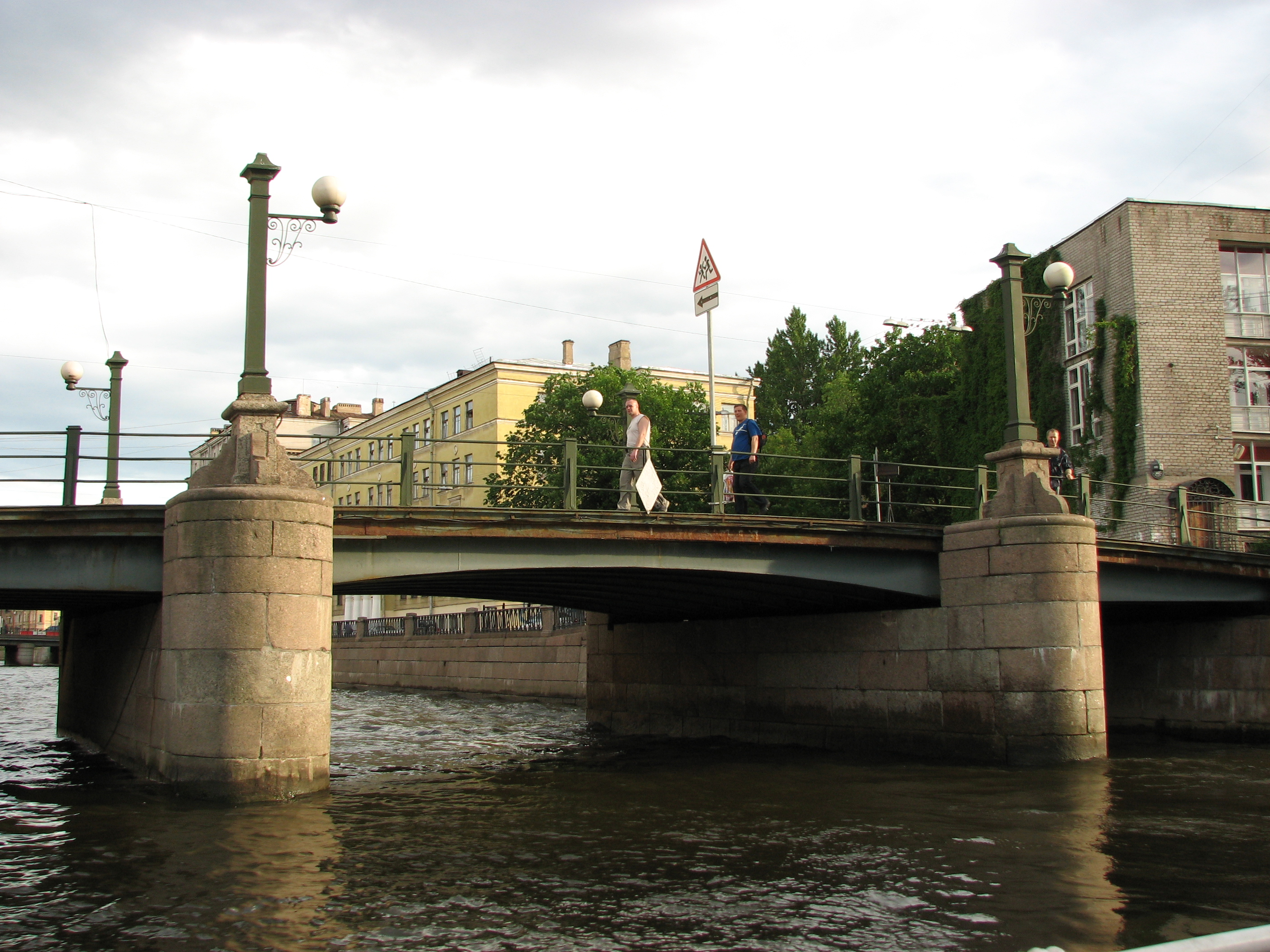
Matveev Bridge, 2007

Matveevsky Bridge is a three-span metal bridge with a continuous beam system. The breakdown of the spans is as follows: 6.45 + 11.15 + 6.45 m. The bridge is oblique in plan. The superstructure consists of eight steel I-beams with a curvilinear silhouette on the lower portion. The bridge is united by transverse beams. A reinforced concrete slab is arranged on top of the beams. The supports are made of rubble masonry and are clad with granite. The total width of the bridge is 9.78 m (of which the width of the carriageway is 6.98 m and the two sidewalks are 1.4 m each). The length of the bridge is 24.7 (27.1) m.

The bridge is intended for the movement of vehicles and pedestrians. The carriageway of the bridge includes two lanes for traffic. The roadway and sidewalks are covered with asphalt concrete. The railing is made of metal, and is of a simple design. Four artistically cast street lamps on four granite pedestals complete the appearance of the bridge.

== See also ==
- List of Bridges in Saint Petersburg
