= Richard A. Lockshin =

American cellular biologist (born 1937)

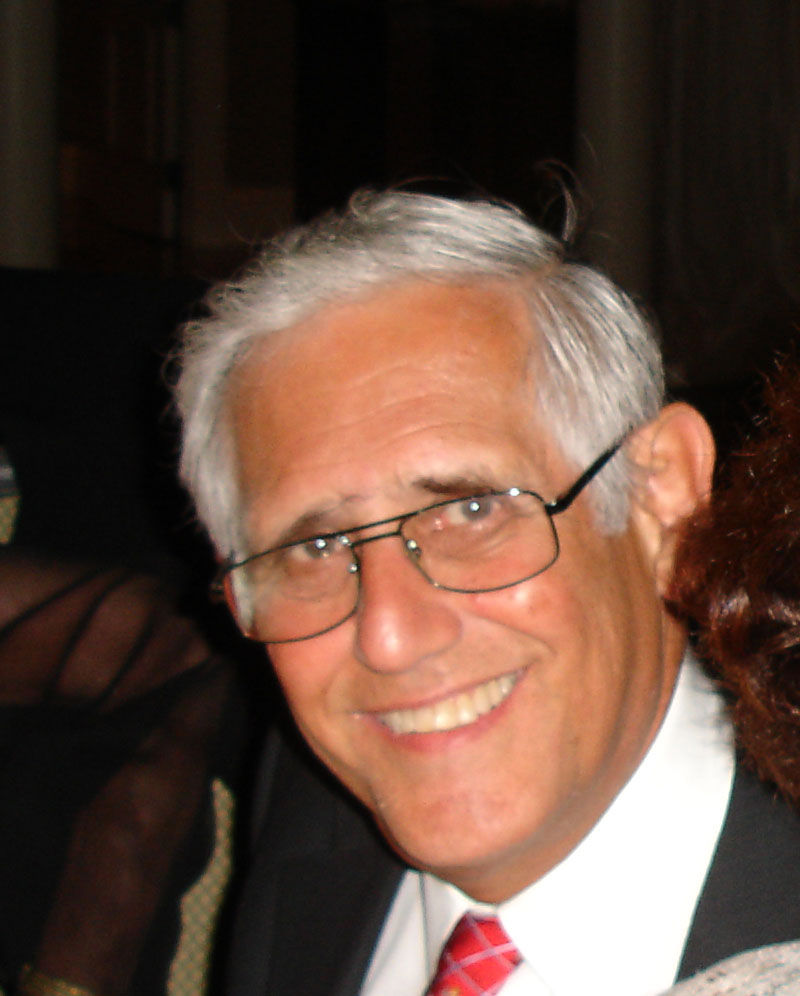
- Richard A. Lockshin
- Born: December 1937 (age 88); Columbus, Ohio
- Education: Harvard University
- Known for: apoptosis
- Scientific career
- Doctoral advisor: Carroll Williams

Richard A. Lockshin (born December 1937 in Columbus, Ohio) is an American cellular biologist known for his work on apoptosis.

== Academic background ==
He was educated at Harvard University where, in 1959, he obtained his bachelor's degree. This was followed by doctoral studies at Harvard University under the guidance of Carroll Williams. Lockshin focused mainly on developmental cell death in insects and for which he received his Ph.D. in 1963. In 1964, Lockshin and Williams published their landmark contribution on "Programmed Cell Death: Endocrine potentiation of the breakdown of the intersegmental muscles of silkmoths", in which they coined the term, programmed cell death, during a time in which little research was being carried out on this topic.

Richard Lockshin has made significant contributions to the cell death community. He was one of the founders of the International Cell Death Society and acted as the society's president from 1998 to 2002.

Richard Lockshin is a retired emeritus professor of St. John's University (Jamaica, NY). Lockshin has a twin brother, Michael D. Lockshin, a rheumatologist.

== Career ==
His laboratory and study group at St. John's University focused on the causal mechanisms of apoptosis, or programmed cell death. The following is specifically was taken from his St. John's University Profile Page:

Our laboratory has focused for many years on cell death, a field that now boasts over 100,000 publications and is known also by the terms "apoptosis" and "programmed cell death". First recognized in development (where does the tail of a metamorphosing tadpole go?), cell death is now considered to be a major component of development, homeostasis, aging, and many diseases. Some examples are:

Most developmental abnormalities (teratologies) arise from excessive or insufficient cell death. In the developing central nervous system, as many as half of the newly-born cells die, with this death being essential for proper neural development. Many forms of cancer are failures of cells to die at the right time. At least half of the cells that die in a heart attack could be salvaged if we knew how to control cell death. A major approach in treating AIDS is to limit the death of the T-cells (most of which are not infected with virus but rather are induced to commit suicide), and Alzheimer's Disease is inherently a problem of cell death.

We have looked for many years at signaling mechanisms inducing cells to die as well as the proteases that take the cells apart and may be the killing mechanism. Currently we focus on two major directions: Proteases other than caspases (proteases with very restricted substrate specificity that are the major proteases in apoptosis) and the acquisition by an embryo of the ability to undergo apoptosis. These studies have taken us, including many students, to many countries including (2000-2002) Canada, Spain, Italy, Sweden, Switzerland, Israel, Austria, and Australia.
