= Dekabristov Bridge =

Bridge in Admiralteysky, Saint Petersburg, Russia

Dekabristov Bridge Мост Декабристов
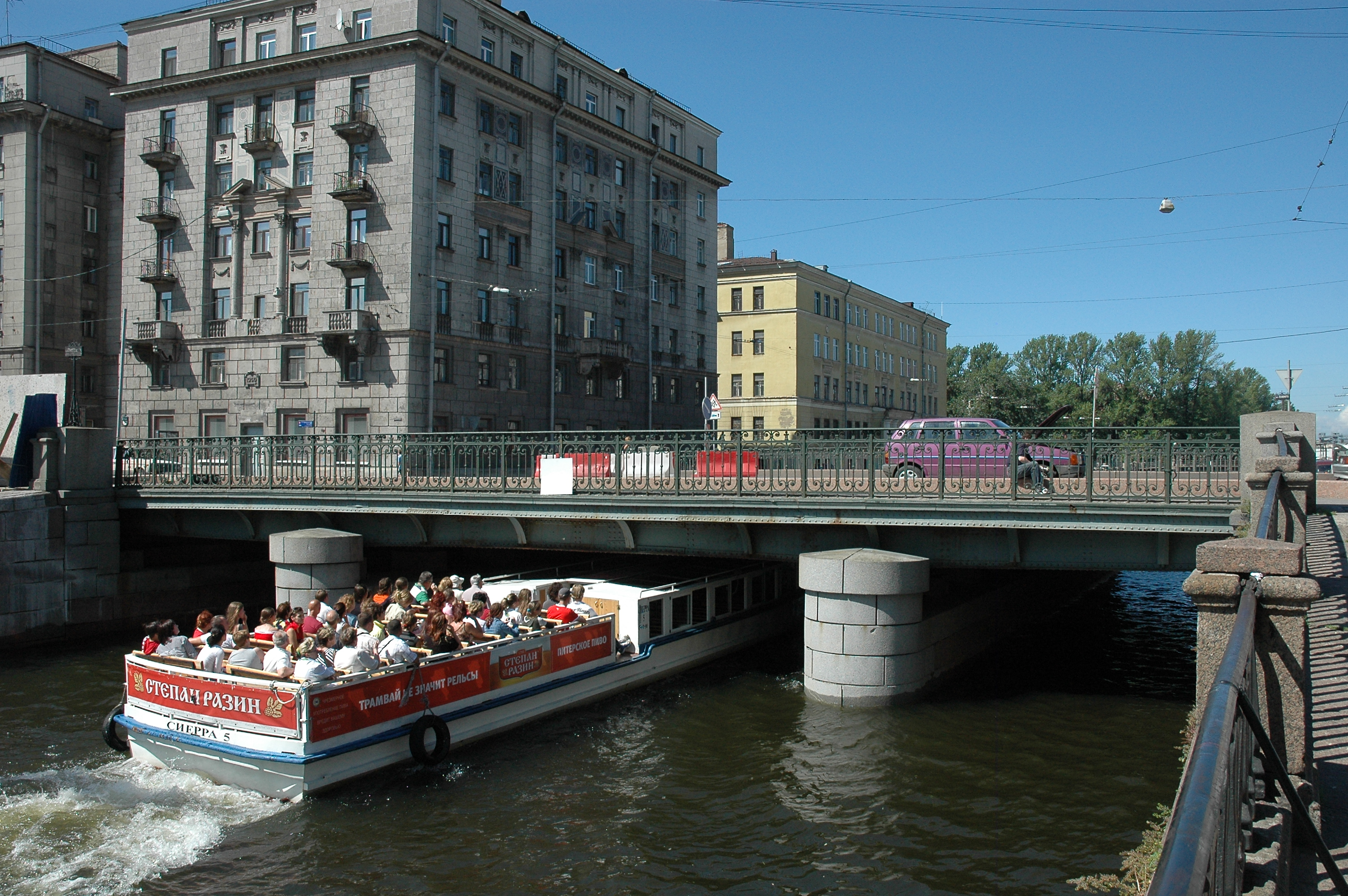
- Coordinates: 59°55′34″N 30°17′41″E
- Crosses: Kryukov Canal
- Locale: Admiralteysky District, Saint Petersburg
- Heritage status: Cultural heritage of the peoples of the Russian Federation, Regional importance, Monument of urban planning and architecture
- Registry number: 781710970920005

Characteristics
- Design: Girder
- Material: Steel
- Total length: 29 m (95 ft)
- Width: 23.3 m (76 ft)
- Traversable?: Automobiles, pedestrians

History
- Opened: 1787
- Rebuilt: 1876, 1914

The Dekabristov Bridge is a steel girder bridge across the Kryukov Canal in the Admiralteysky District of Saint Petersburg, Russia. The bridge connects the Kolomensky and Kazansky Islands. It is a monument of history and culture.

== Location ==
Dekabristov Bridge is located along the axis of Dekabristov Street (formerly Ofitsersky Street or Officer Street).

The Mariinsky Theater is located next to the bridge.

Upstream is the Matveevsky Bridge, below the Torgovy Bridge.

The nearest metro stations are Sadovaya, Sennaya Ploschad, and Spasskaya.

== Name ==
Since 1798, the bridge was called Ofitsersky Bridge, having been named after Ofitsersky (Officer) street. On 6 October 1923, the bridge was renamed the Dekabristov Bridge or Decembrists Bridge.

== History ==
The Dekabristov Bridge was built in 1783–1787. It was made according to the standard design for the bridges of the Kryukov Canal. Dekabristov Bridge was a three-span wooden bridge on supports made of rubble masonry, and faced with granite. The central span was movable, and the side ones were girders. The author of the project is unknown.

In 1876, the bridge was rebuilt and broadened by 1.5 m (4 ft 11 in) to lay a horse-drawn tram line.

In 1914, in connection with the increasing traffic on Officer Street, the bridge was rebuilt according to the design of engineer A.P. Pshenitsky, while its width increased from 13 to 23.3 m (43 to 76 ft). Additional piles were hammered in places for the expansion of the supports and a concrete slab was laid. For this, part of the Kryukov Canal water was pumped out, and the work was carried out in a dry pit. New railings were also installed.

In 1990, work was carried out to replace the granite parapet.

== Construction ==
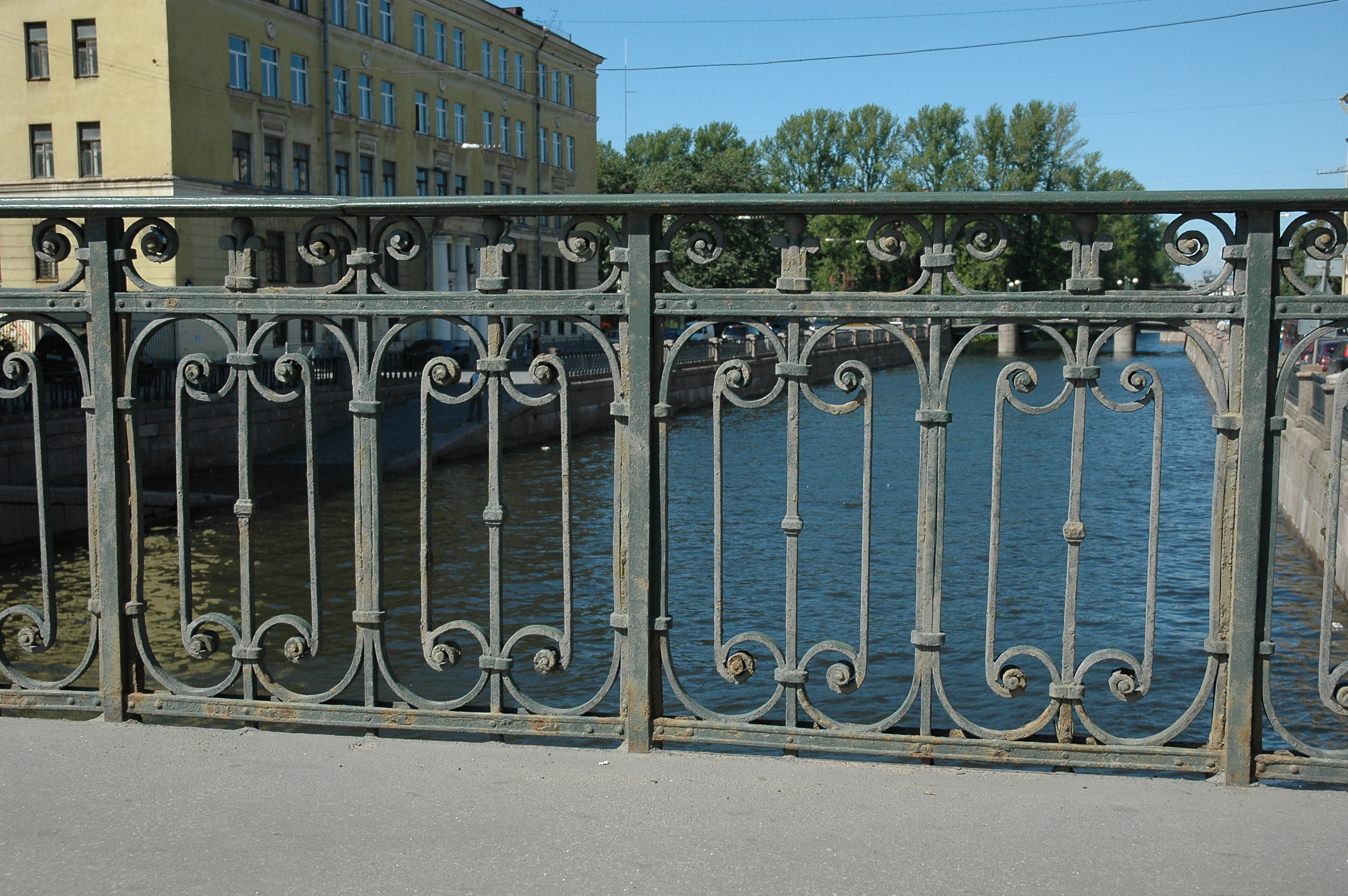
Bridge railing

Dekabristov Bridge is a three-span metal bridge with a continuous beam system. Here is the breakdown of the spans: 6.6 m (22 ft) + 11 m (36 ft) + 6.6 m (22 ft). The superstructure consists of 10 riveted iron I-beams connected by transverse beams. A concrete slab is arranged on top of the beams. Under the beams in the middle span there is a concave silhouette to increase the dimensions under the bridge. The supports are made of rubble masonry with massive granite cladding. The total width of the bridge is 23.3 m (76 ft) (of which the width of the carriageway is 19.1 m (63 ft) and the two sidewalks are 2.1 m (6 ft 11 in) each). The length of the bridge is 24.3 m (80 ft) (29 m (95 ft)).

The bridge is intended for the movement of vehicles and pedestrians. The carriageway of the bridge includes 5 lanes for traffic. The roadway and sidewalks are covered with asphalt concrete. The sidewalks are separated from the roadway by a high granite curb. Metal railings of artistic forging complete the picture.

== See also ==
- List of bridges in Saint Petersburg
