= Arnold Lockshin =

Russian-American scientist

Arnold Lockshin (born February 3, 1939) is an American-born Russian scientist. After he was dismissed from a position as a cancer researcher in Houston, Texas, he and his family received political asylum and citizenship in the Soviet Union. The film director Michael Lockshin is his son.

== Early life ==
Lockshin was born in San Francisco. His ancestors on his father's side were Soviet Jews who fled to escape antisemitic persecution. He attended high school in Richmond, California, and graduated in 1956. He attended the University of California, Berkeley and earned an undergraduate degree in biochemistry. He completed a doctorate in biochemistry at the University of Wisconsin.

== Early career ==
Lockshin performed cancer research at the USC School of Medicine between 1977 and 1980. From 1980 to 1986, Lockshin worked at the Stehlin Foundation, a cancer research facility associated with St. Joseph Hospital in Houston. He was terminated from that position.

Leadership at the Stehlin Foundation said that he was fired because of his deteriorating work performance. Lockshin said that the Federal Bureau of Investigation was involved in his firing and that he and his family had been the targets of death threats and other forms of harassment. Lockshin said that he and his wife had long supported socialism and that he had previously been a Communist Party USA organizer. Dorothy Healey described his Party role as a district organizer, calling him "a rigid dogmatist". He said that the government harassment was brought on by his political beliefs.

== Political asylum ==
The USSR leadership provided them with the requested asylum, gave Lockshin an apartment in Moscow and assisted him in securing employment. Subsequently, he and his wife Lauren gave numerous interviews and press-conferences in Moscow accusing American secret services of persecuting dissidents in the United States. In 1989 they published a book, in Russian, as well as English, titled Silent Terror: One family's history of political persecution in the United States.

== Later life ==
In 1992 Lockshin received Russian citizenship by order of Russian president Boris Yeltsin. Lockshin continued to work in the Blokhin Oncological Scientific Center in Moscow as a research biologist until the late 1990s.

Subsequently, Arnold and Lauren disappeared from public view. Their current whereabouts are unknown. However, at least two of their children appear currently to live in Russia, including his daughter, Jennifer, who works at the State University – Higher School of Economics. Their son, Michael, is a Russian film director known for his film The Master and Margarita. In an interview in 2017, Arnold Lockshin said that he had separated from his wife at some point after moving.

On July 21, 2013, Arnold Lockshin appeared on a TV talk-show hosted by Igor Vittel on the Russian RBC channel and spoke in support of political asylum for Edward Snowden.

== See also ==
- COINTELPRO
- Criticism of the United States government
- Surveillance abuse
