= Michael D. Lockshin =

American professor and medical researcher (born 1937)

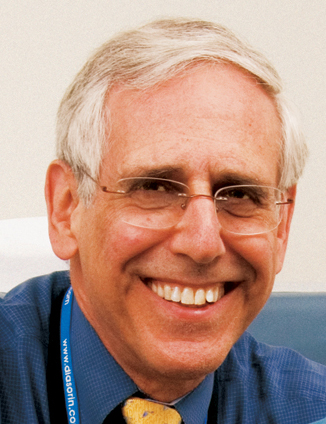
- Michael D. Lockshin
- Born: December 9, 1937 (age 88); Columbus, Ohio, US
- Education: Harvard Medical School
- Occupations: Professor, medical researcher
- Known for: Autoimmune diseases
- Scientific career
- Workplaces: Hospital for Special Surgery

Michael D. Lockshin (born December 9, 1937) is an American professor and medical researcher. He is known for his work as a researcher of autoimmune diseases, with focus on antiphospholipid syndrome and lupus. He is Professor Emeritus of Medicine and the Director Emeritus and Founding Director of the Barbara Volcker Center for Women and Rheumatic Disease at Hospital for Special Surgery. He retired from HSS on January 31, 2023.

Lockshin's twin brother, Richard A. Lockshin, is an American cellular biologist known for his work on apoptosis.

== Education and training ==
Lockshin graduated cum laude from Harvard College in 1959 with an AB in history and literature. He received his MD in 1963 from Harvard Medical School. Lockshin interned and did his residency at Bellevue Hospital and the Memorial Sloan Kettering Cancer Center and his fellowship in rheumatic diseases at Columbia Presbyterian Medical Center in New York City.

== Work ==
Lockshin's long-term research interest is in the clinical aspects of systemic lupus erythematosus (SLE), antiphospholipid syndrome (APS), pregnancy in rheumatic disease patients, gender and rheumatic disease, and neurological SLE.

He has written three books for the general reading public. Guarded Prognosis: A Doctor and his Patients Talk about Chronic Disease and How to Cope With It (Hill and Wang, a division of Farrar, Straus and Giroux) was published in 1998. Dancing at the River’s Edge: A Patient and Her Doctor Negotiate a Life With Chronic Illness is a personal dual memoir, written in collaboration with long-time patient Alida Brill. His latest book, The Prince at the Ruined Tower: Time, Uncertainty & Chronic Illness explores seldom discussed issues of contemporary medical practice, such as how patients, doctors, insurers, and administrators should and do respond when diagnoses are uncertain.

Lockshin has authored nearly 300 scientific papers, book chapters, and books and has edited several conference proceedings and books. In addition, he co-authored the first reports on hepatitis B–associated polyarteritis nodosa; early reports on twins with lupus; studies on neurologic lupus, including treatment and cognitive dysfunction; pregnancy and lupus; atherosclerosis and lupus, and many research papers on the antiphospholipid antibody syndrome. He convened the first International Conference on Pregnancy and Rheumatic Disease and, though the Barbara Volker Center, the first Conference on Gender, Biology, and Human Disease. His research has been supported by grants from NIAMS, the Arthritis Foundation, the SLE Foundation, and private donors throughout his academic career.

Lockshin served as editor-in-chief of Arthritis & Rheumatism for five years. He has served on the editorial board of the Journal of Rheumatology, and as a reviewer for the New England Journal of Medicine, the Journal of Clinical Investigation, and the Journal of Immunology, among other scientific journals.

Lockshin held senior management positions at the National Institutes of Health in Bethesda, Maryland. He served first as director of the Extramural Program of the National Institute of Arthritis and Musculoskeletal and Skin Diseases (NIAMS) and then as acting director of the Institute. This Institute is responsible for U.S. government research funding in the fields of rheumatology and dermatology. He also served as Senior Advisor to the Director at the NIH's Clinical Center.

== Honors ==
Lockshin received the Lupus Foundation of America's 2012 National Leadership Award for Lupus Medical Advancement and a Lifetime Achievement Award from the New York Arthritis Foundation in 2008. He was named a master of the American College of Rheumatology in 2003 and a Research Hero of the Arthritis Foundation in 2001. He is an honorary faculty member of Alpha Omega Alpha.

== Committee membership ==
Lockshin has served on numerous study sections and ad hoc committees for the National Institutes of Health, the Veterans' Administration, the Canadian Arthritis and Rheumatism Society, the Canadian Medical Research Council, the SLE Foundation, among others. He chaired the American Board of Internal Medicine's Sub Specialty Committee on Rheumatology and the American College of Physicians' Medical Knowledge Self-Assessment Program. He chaired the Arthritis Foundation's Professional Education and Unproven Remedies Committees and the American College of Rheumatology's Education Committee. He chaired the ACR's Audiovisual Aids Committee that produced the first Clinical Slide Collection in rheumatology.

== Books ==
- The Prince at the Ruined Tower: Time, Uncertainty & Chronic Illness by Michael D. Lockshin, M.D. (Custom Databanks, Inc., Paperback and eBook, March 2017)
- Dancing at the River's Edge: A Patient and Her Doctor Negotiate Life with Chronic Illness by Alida Brill and Michael D. Lockshin, M.D. (Hardcover, Schaffner Press, January 2009)
- The Hospital for Special Surgery Rheumatoid Arthritis Handbook by Stephen A. Paget, M.D., Michael D. Lockshin M.D., and Suzanne Loeb (Paperback, Wiley October 2001)
- Guarded Prognosis: A Doctor and His Patients Talk About Chronic Disease and How to Cope With It by Michael D. Lockshin, M.D. (Hardcover, Farrar Straus & Giroux, June 1998)
