= Michael Lockshin (film director) =

American film director (born 1981)

- Михаил Локшин
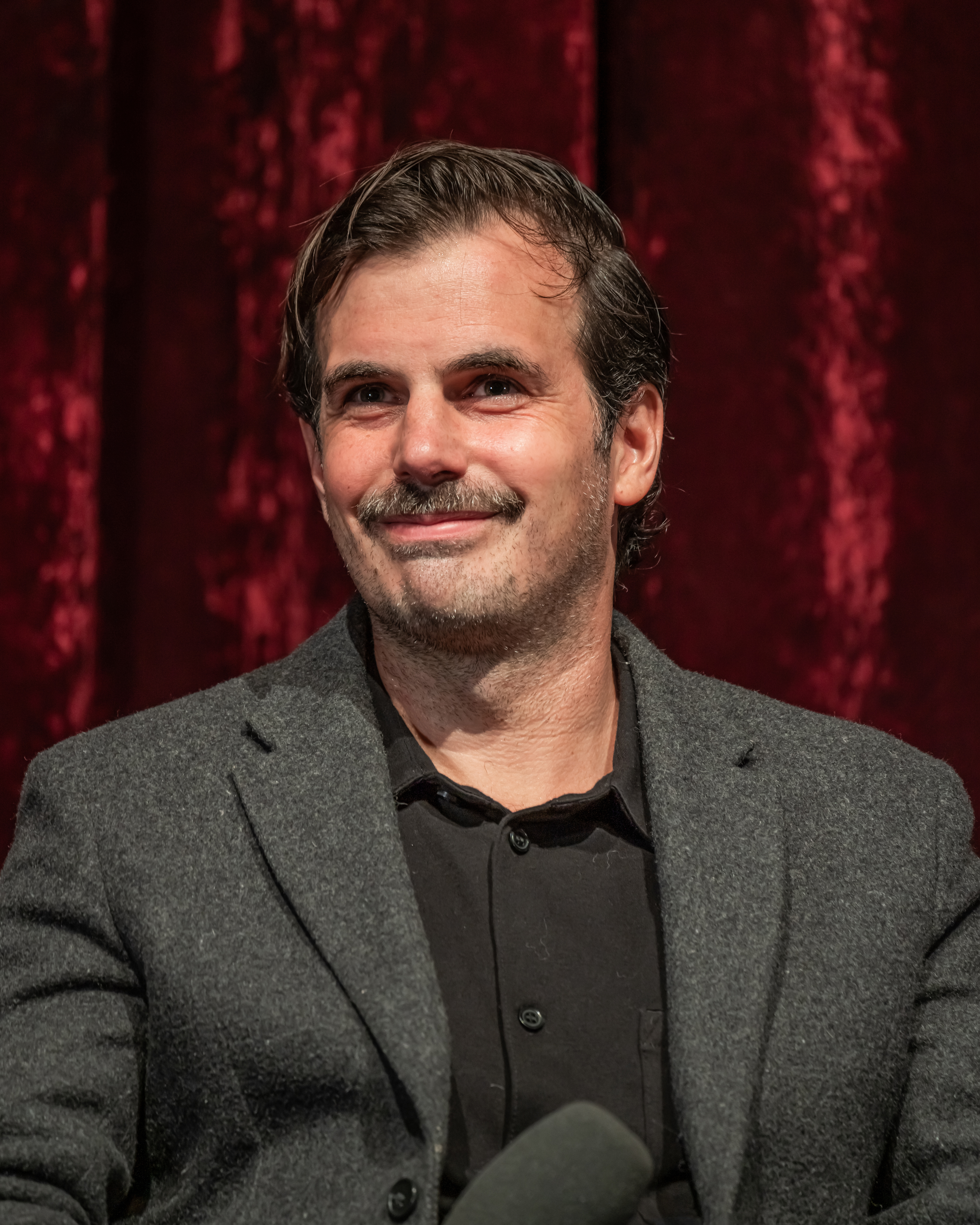
- Michael Lockshin in 2024
- Born: 1981 (age 44–45); United States
- Years active: 2010–present
- Notable work: The Silver Skates, The Master and Margarita

Michael Lockshin (Russian: Михаил Арнольдович Локшин; born 1981) is a film director and writer, known for The Master and Margarita and Silver Skates.

== Early life and education ==
Lockshin was born in 1981 in the United States and grew up in both the United States and Russia.

Lockshin graduated with an MA degree in psychology from Moscow State University. After graduation, Lockshin moved to London, where he began directing commercials and music videos.

== Personal life ==
According to Business Insider, Lockshin is not a Russian citizen. He lives in Los Angeles.

He is the son of the scientist Arnold Lockshin, who received political asylum in the USSR.

He has Jewish heritage.

== Career ==
While still studying in college, Lockshin started working in the film industry. He shot commercials for over 10 years, and his spots won numerous awards, including Cannes Lions Young Director's Awards, Golden Drum, and others. The David Duchovny ad (2014) went viral.

Lockshin's debut feature film, Silver Skates, shot in 2019, was released theatrically Christmas 2020 in Russia to high acclaim. The movie became the first Russian-language Netflix Originals movie. It premiered as the Opening Film of the Moscow International Film Festival. At the 20th Golden Eagle Awards (2021), Silver Skates was nominated for 12 awards, a record in the history of the Golden Eagle Awards, and won 6 awards, including "Best Picture". Lockshin himself was nominated for Best Director. The film also won "Best Picture" from the Association of Producers awards (APKIT), and won several awards at the Nika Awards in 2021, with Lockshin up in the category "Discovery of the Year".

His second feature film The Master and Margarita, which he also co-wrote, is based on Mikhail Bulgakov's novel The Master and Margarita, and stars German actor August Diehl. The film was shot in 2021. The film's release date was pushed multiple times due to the Russian invasion of Ukraine, the film's anti-totalitarian message and problems with funding the film's post-production. Initially slated for a release by Universal Pictures in 2023, the film's release date was pushed back multiple times with attempts to censor the film. Since Universal Pictures pulled out of Russia as did other western companies after the war, the film was released by Atmosphefa Kino in Russia on January 25, 2024.

The movie received overwhelmingly positive reviews from critics and audiences, with Russia's most prominent film critic - Anton Dolin calling the film "The best blockbuster out of Russia in its post-Soviet history". However the film was targeted by nationalist activists, propagandists, and government officials, including Vladimir Solovyev, Margarita Simonyan, Zakhar Prilepin, and Tigran Keosayan who complained about the film's anti-regime stance, and the fact that the Ministry of Culture had provided funding for a film seen as propagating anti-Putin and anti-war ideas, even though it was shot before Russia's full-scale invasion into Ukraine. They demanded a criminal investigation into the film and into Lockshin himself for his vocal pro-Ukrainian views on the Russia's invasion into Ukraine. This was echoed by parliament members of the State Duma as well.

The film received a record 14 nominations and 6 wins at the annual Russian Guild of Film Critics Awards, including winning Best Feature Film. It received seven nominations and seven wins at the Russian Film Academy's Nika Awards, including Best Picture. At the same time the official state-sponsored government film awards Golden Eagle totally ignored the film in their nomination because of the director's stance on the war. At the Nika Awards ceremony those receiving the prizes had to agree to not mention the director's name. Despite all the backlash, the film became one of the highest-grossing films ever at the Russian box office, and the #1 highest-grossing film with an 18+ rating.

In 2025 the film was released theatrically to mostly positive reviews in Germany, Austria, Italy, Czechia, Sweden and other countries.
