= Kryukov Canal =

Canal in St. Petersburg Russia

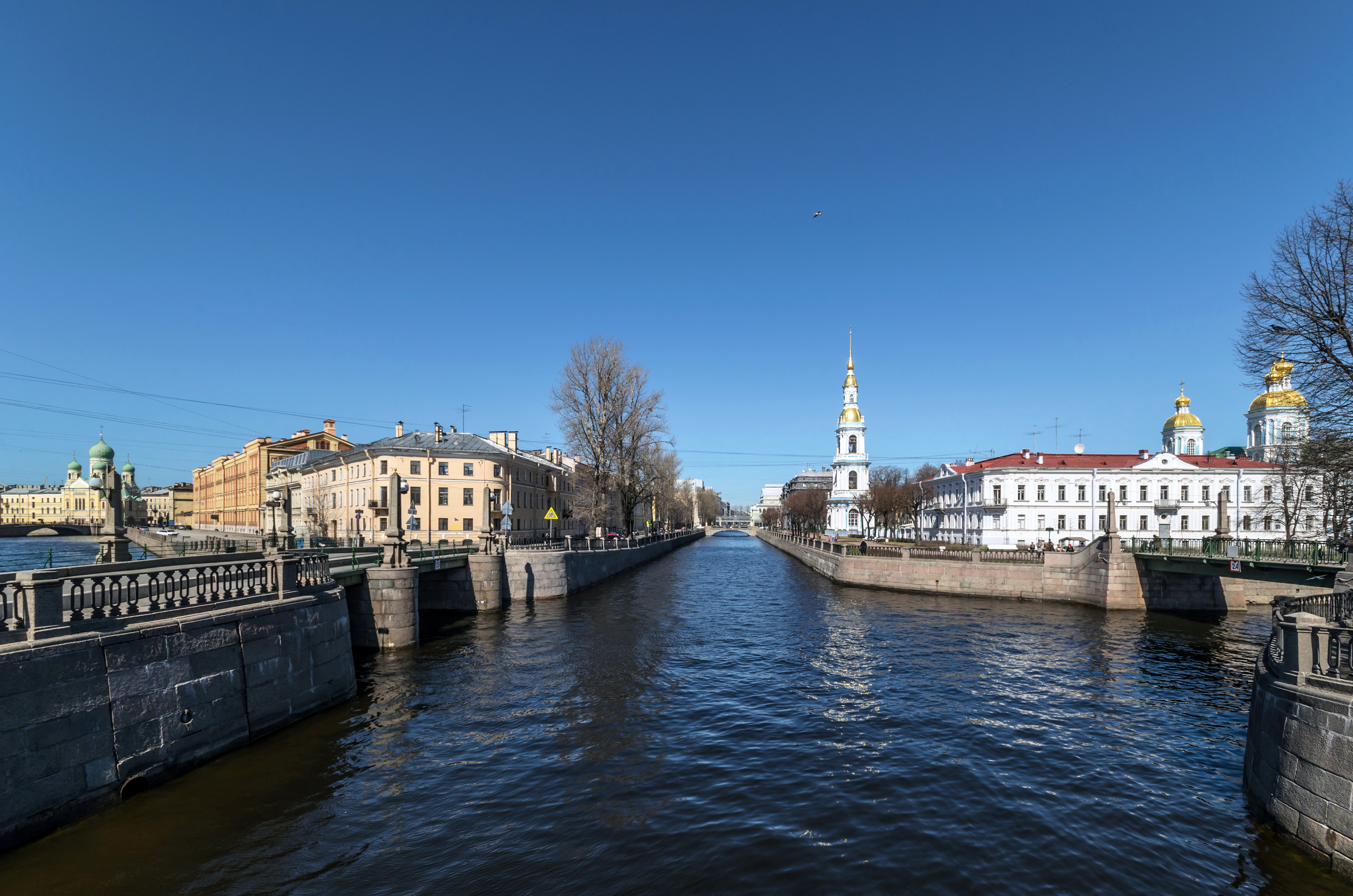
- View of Kryukov Canal and the Bell Tower of St. Nicholas Naval Cathedral

Specifications
- Status: open
- Navigation authority: State Water Register, 01040300322302000008594

Geography
- Start point: Admiralteysky Canal
- End point: Fontanka River
- Beginning coordinates: 59°55′40″N 30°17′37″E
- Ending coordinates: 59°55′05″N 30°18′04″E

Kryukov Canal (Russian: Крюков канал) is one of the canals in central Saint Petersburg, Russia.

== Name ==
In 1738, the canal was named after the contractor Semyon Kryukov.

== History ==
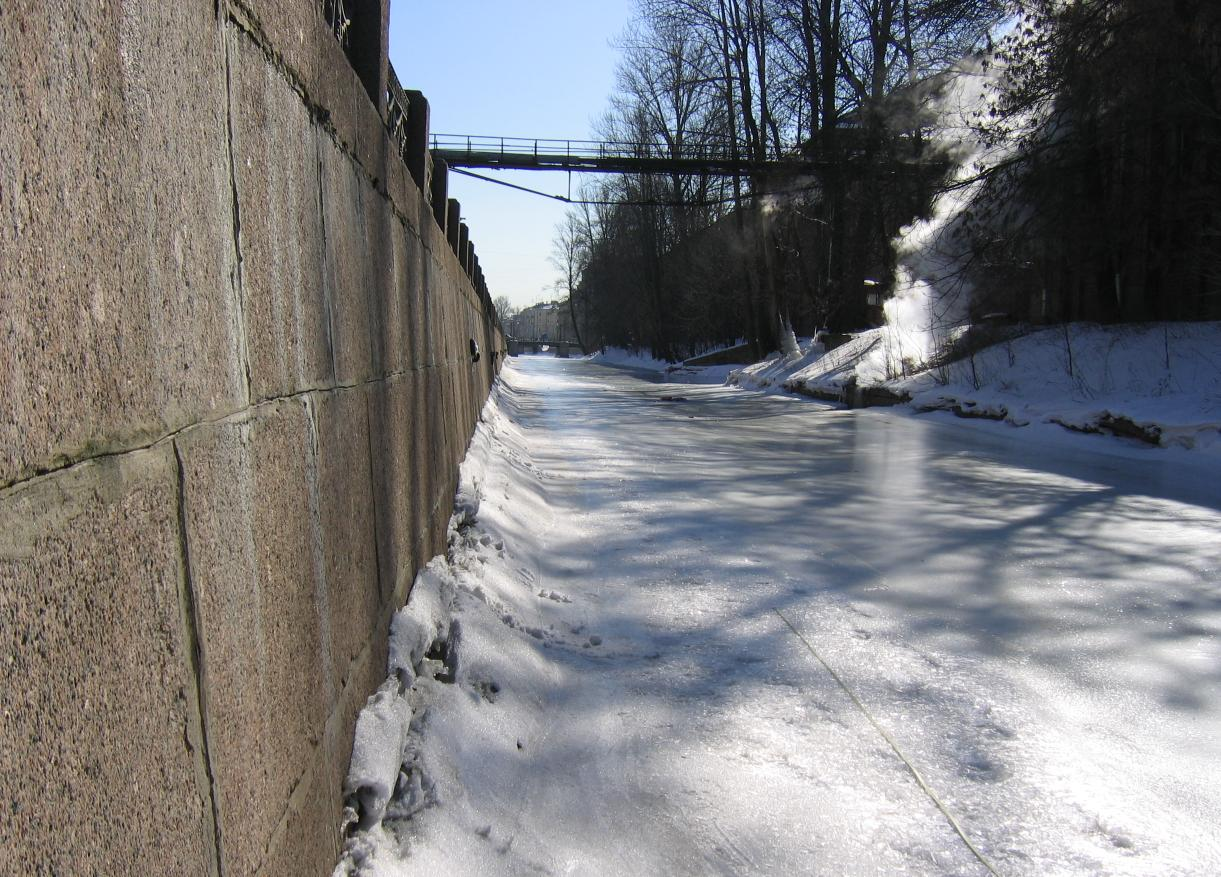
Kryukov canal near New Holland

The Kryukov Canal runs from the Admiralteysky Canal in the area of the present Labor Square and all the way to the Fontanka River.

Kryukov Canal was originally dug in 1719–1720 from the Neva River to the Moyka River for transport purposes. During the construction of part of the Annunciation Bridge, some water was piped through the present Labor Square. The water pipe has survived to this day.

Since 1830, the section from the Moyka to the Fontanka became called the Kryukov Canal. Granite embankments were built in 1801–1807.

== Geographic information ==
The length is 1.5 km, the width is up to 20 m, and the depth is 2 m. Together with the Admiralteysky Canal, the Kryukov Canal separates the New Holland Island from the Second Admiralteysky Island.

== Bridges across the Kryukov Canal ==
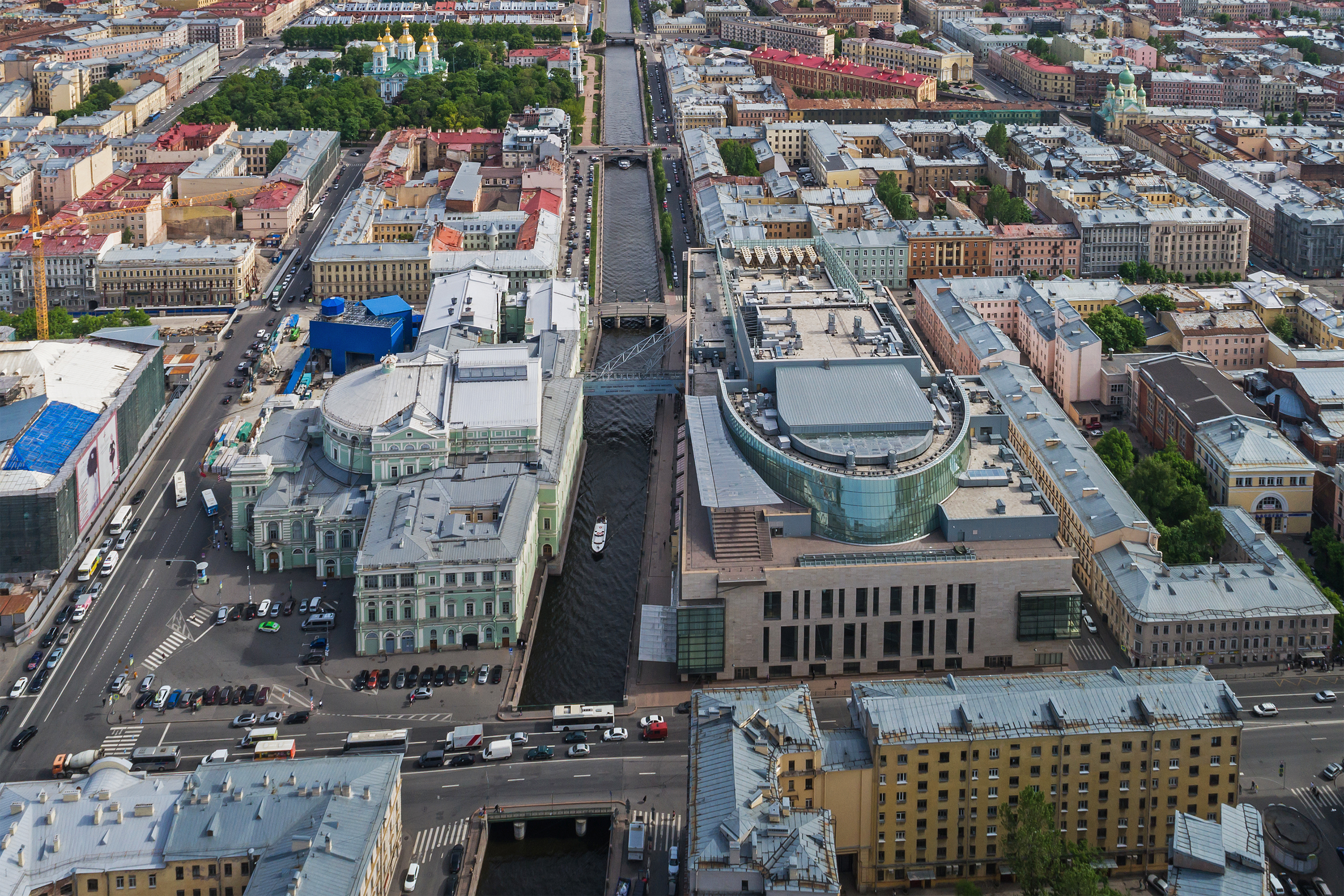
Bridges over the canal

- Smezhny Bridge
- Staro-Nikolsky Bridge
- Kashin Bridge
- Torgovy Bridge
- Dekabristov Bridge
- Matveevsky Bridge
