= St. Nicholas Naval Cathedral =

Eastern Orthodox church in Saint Petersburg, Russia

Coordinates: 59°55′20″N 30°18′01″E

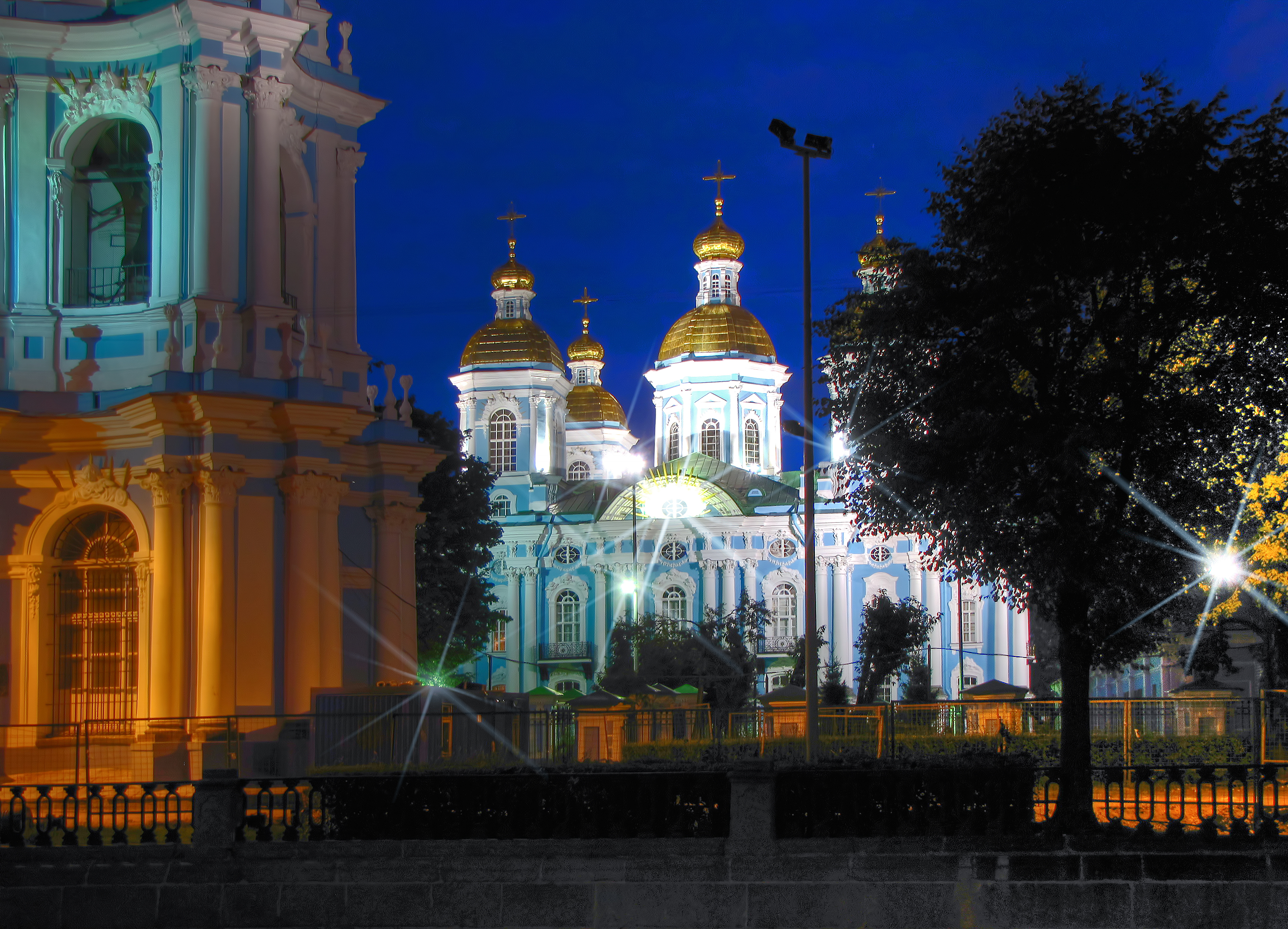
The cathedral illuminated at night

St. Nicholas Naval Cathedral (Никольский морской собор, Nikolskiy morskoy sobor) is a major Baroque Orthodox cathedral in the western part of Central Saint Petersburg. It has always been closely associated with the Russian Navy, serving as its main shrine until the Russian Revolution.

In the upper church there are numerous memorial plaques for the crews of the sunken Soviet submarines, including K-278 Komsomolets. The crew of the submarine K-141 Kursk has also been commemorated there.

The marine regimental church was built on the bank of the Kryukov Canal in 1753–1762 to a design by Savva Chevakinsky, the main architect of the Russian Navy, in place of an earlier wooden church. A freestanding four story bell tower with a tall gilded spire was erected in 1755–1758. The main church is dedicated to Saint Nicholas (a patron saint of seamen) and the feast of the Epiphany.

St. Nicholas Naval Cathedral consists of two separate churches. The Saint Nicholas Church is located at ground level, while the Epiphany Church is on the floor above. The altar of the upper church was consecrated in the presence of Catherine the Great. The main shrine of the cathedral—a Greek icon of St. Nicholas made in the 17th century with a portion of his relics—is located in the lower church.

In 1908 the Tsushima obelisk was erected in the garden in front of the church in memory of those killed at Battle of Tsushima. In 2000 another chapel was consecrated in the lower tier of the bell tower.

St. Nicholas Cathedral is a major example of Elizabethan or Rastrellieqsque Baroque. It has the shape of a cross and is decorated by Corinthian columns, stucco architraves, a wide entablement and is crowned by five gilded domes. The church can accommodate up to 5,000 people.

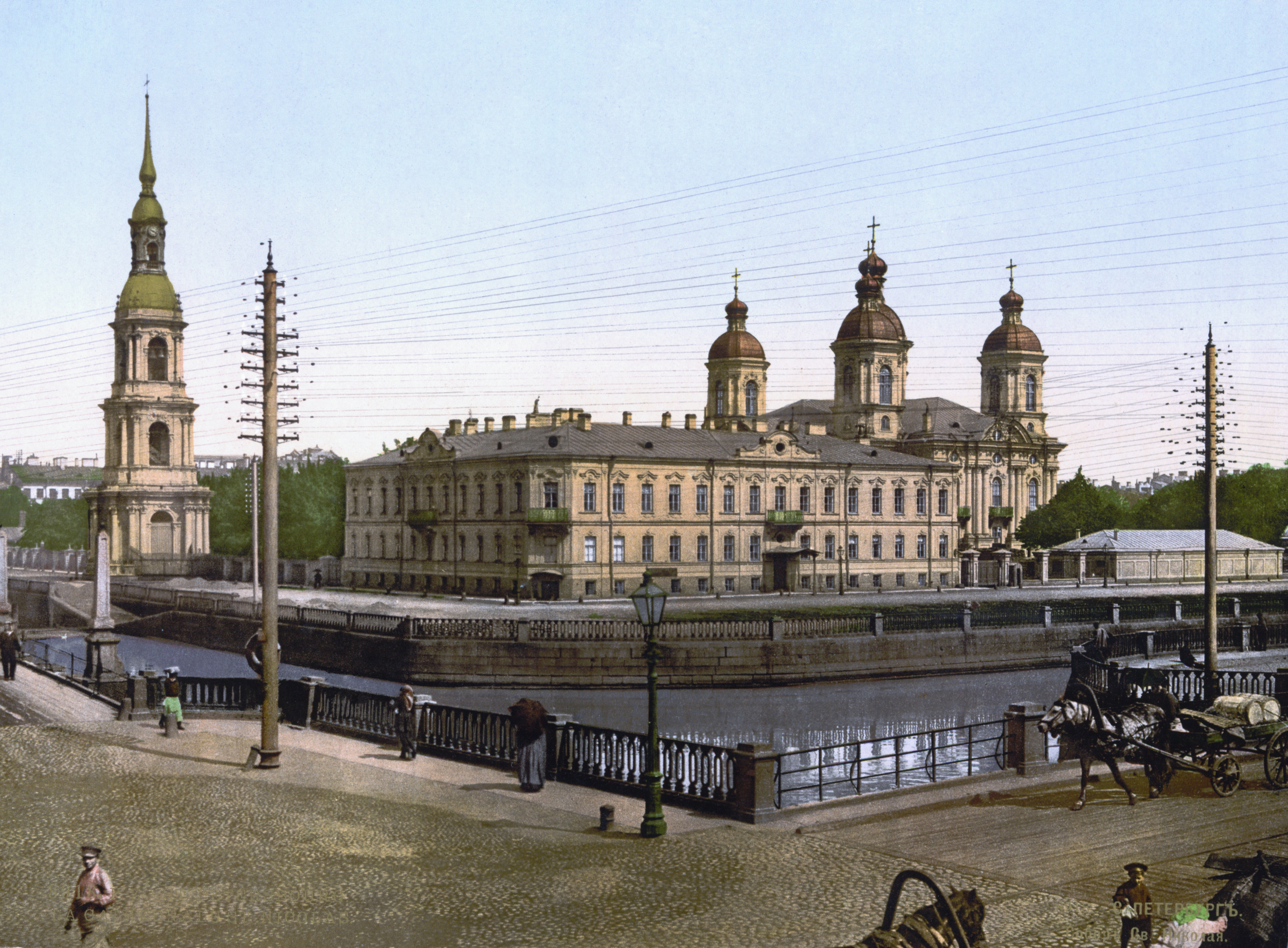
A postcard from the 1890s

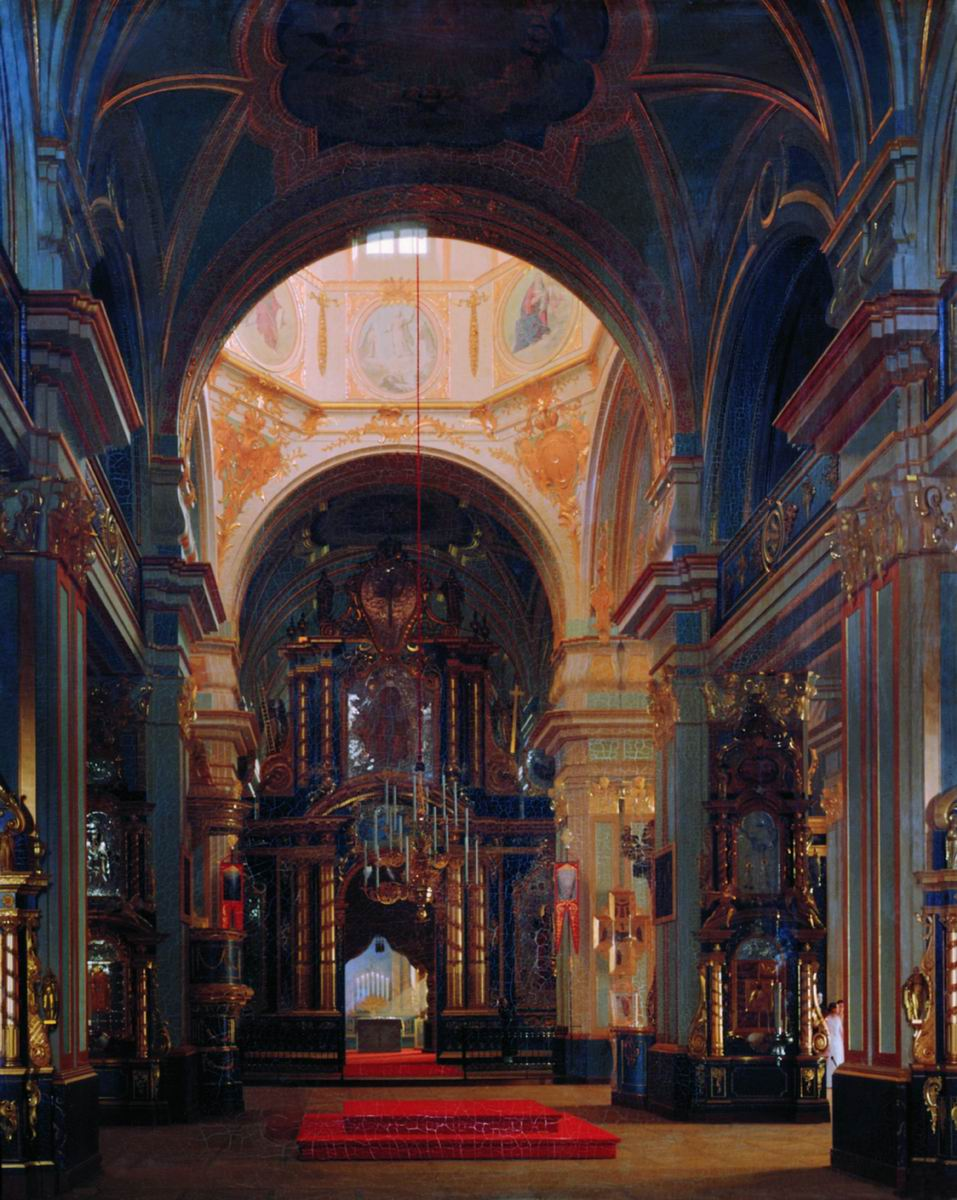
A painting of the cathedral's interior, 1843

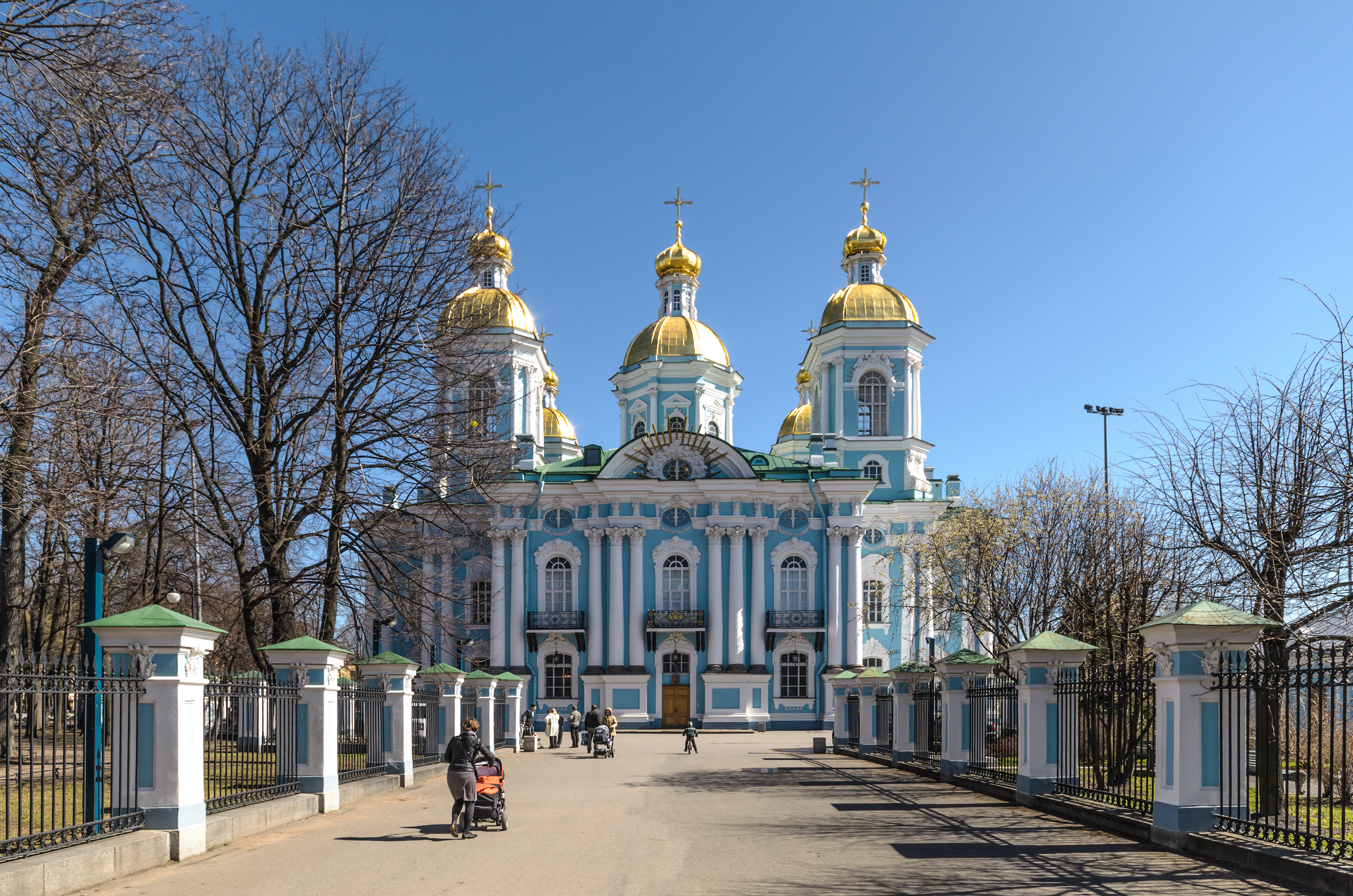
The facade in 2013

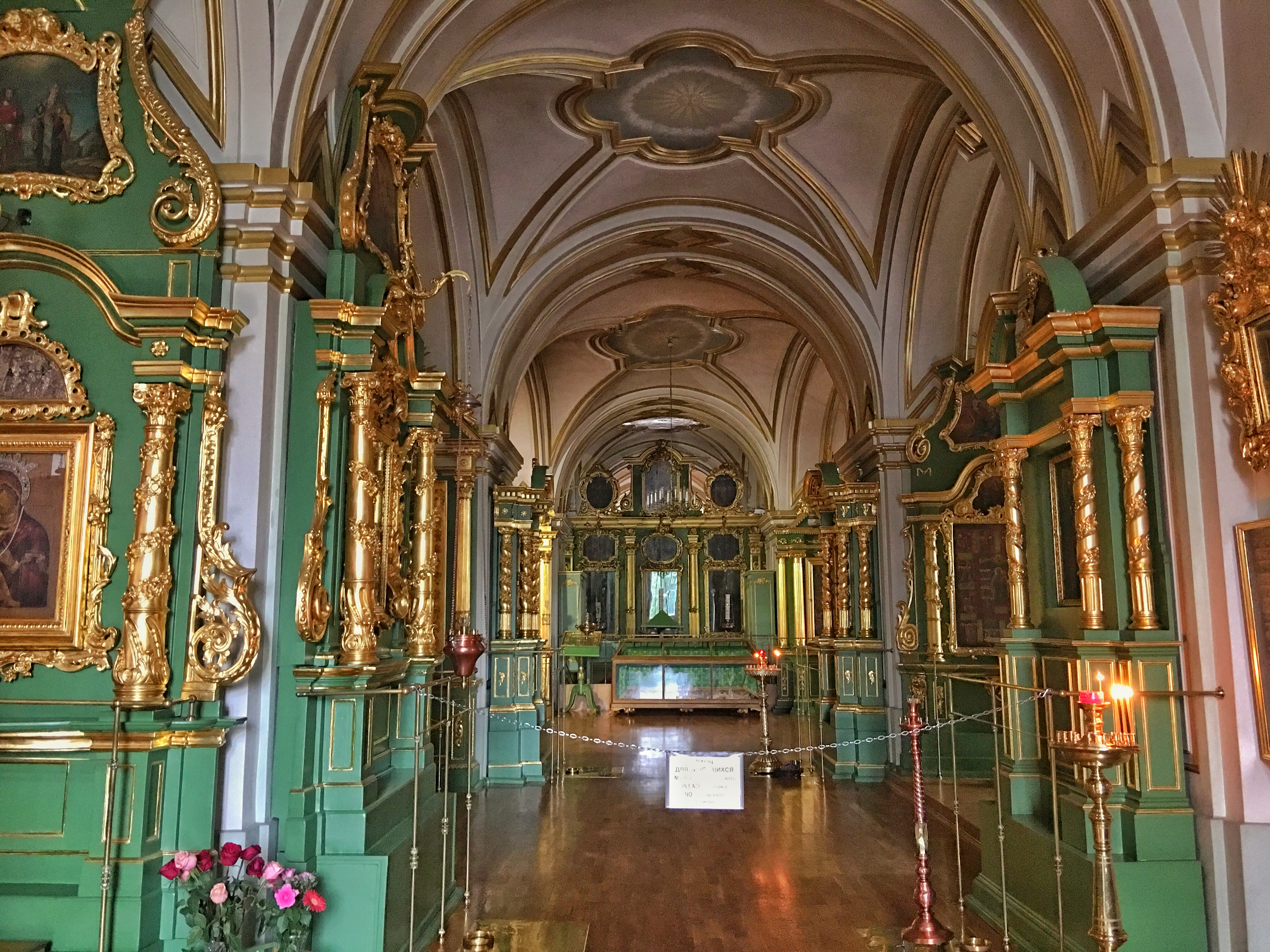
The lower church in 2017

== See also ==
- List of largest Eastern Orthodox church buildings
