= The Men They Couldn't Hang discography =

- Studio albums: 10
- EPs: 4
- Live albums: 3
- Compilation albums: 6
- Singles: 16
- Video albums: 2

This is the discography of British folk punk band the Men They Couldn't Hang.

== Albums ==
=== Studio albums ===
Title	Album details	Peak chart positions	
Title	Album details	UK	UK Indie
Night of a Thousand Candles	Released: July 1985; Label: Imp; Formats: LP, MC	91	1
How Green Is the Valley	Released: October 1986; Label: MCA; Formats: CD, LP, MC	68	—
Waiting for Bonaparte	Released: 11 April 1988; Label: Magnet; Formats: CD, LP, MC	41	—
Silver Town	Released: April 1989; Label: Silvertone; Formats: CD, LP, MC	38	2
The Domino Club	Released: August 1990; Label: Silvertone; Formats: CD, LP, MC	53	—
Never Born to Follow	Released: November 1996; Label: Demon; Formats: CD, MD, MC	—	—
The Cherry Red Jukebox	Released: September 2003; Label: TMTCH; Formats: CD	—	—
Devil on the Wind	Released: 1 June 2009; Label: Irregular; Formats: CD, digital download	—	—
The Defiant	Released: 22 September 2014; Label: Vinyl Star; Formats: CD, LP, digital download	—	—
Cock-a-Hoop	Released: 7 September 2018; Label: Vinyl Star; Formats: CD, LP, digital download	—	—
"—" denotes releases that did not chart or were not released in that territory.

=== Live albums ===
Title	Album details
Alive, Alive-O	Released: May 1991; Label: Fun After All; Formats: CD, LP, MC
Smugglers and Bounty Hunters	Released: October 2005; Label: Secret; Formats: 2xCD
Dogs Eyes, Owl Meat and Man-Chop	Released: 9 June 2014; Label: Secret; Formats: LP, digital download

=== Compilation albums ===
Title	Album details
Majestic Grill: The Best of the Men They Couldn't Hang	Released: April 1998; Label: Demon; Formats: CD
The Mud, the Blood and the Beer: Best of the Men They Couldn't Hang – Part II	Released: 1999; Label: Self-released; Formats: CD
Demos and Rarities Vol. 1	Released: March 2007; Label: Vinyl Star; Formats: CD
Demos and Rarities Vol. 2	Released: 2008; Label: Vinyl Star; Formats: CD
5 Go Mad on the Other Side	Released: February 2011; Label: Vinyl Star; Formats: 2xCD, digital download
Shun Fame – Stefan Cush Sings Stefan Cush Songs	Released: 5 March 2021; Label: Self-released; Formats: CD, digital download

=== Video albums ===
Title	Album details
21 Years of Love & Hate	Released: 11 July 2005; Label: Snapper Music; Formats: DVD
25 Year Anniversary	Released: 2009; Label: Vinyl Star; Formats: DVD

== EPs ==
Title	Album details
Radio 1 Sessions / The Evening Show	Released: August 1988; Label: Nighttracks; Formats: 12"
Six Pack	Released: 30 June 1997; Label: Demon; Formats: CD
Devil on the Wind EP	Released: June 2009; Label: Irregular; Formats: CD
The Night Ferry EP	Released: April 2014; Label: Vinyl Star; Formats: CD, digital download

== Singles ==
Title	Year	Peak chart positions		Album
Title	Year	UK	UK Indie	Album
"The Green Fields of France (No Man's Land)"	1984	—	6	Night of a Thousand Candles
"Ironmasters"	1985	—	1	Night of a Thousand Candles
"Greenback Dollar"	1985	—	5	Non-album single
"Gold Rush"	1986	99	—	How Green Is the Valley
"Shirt of Blue"	1986	—	—	How Green Is the Valley
"Ghosts of Cable Street"	1987	94	—	How Green Is the Valley
"Island in the Rain"	1987	92	—	Waiting for Bonaparte
"The Colours"	1988	61	—	Waiting for Bonaparte
"The Crest"	1988	94	—	Waiting for Bonaparte
"Rain, Steam & Speed"	1989	88	—	Silver Town
"A Place in the Sun"	1989	—	—	Silver Town
"A Map of Morocco"	1989	—	—	Silver Town
"Great Expectations"	1990	—	—	The Domino Club
"The Lion and the Unicorn"/"Kingdom of the Blind"	1990	—	—	The Domino Club
"Great Expectations (Big Dreams)" (remix)	1992	—	—	Non-album single
"The Eye"	1996	—	—	Never Born to Follow
"—" denotes releases that did not chart.
