= Philip Gaston =

Irish songwriter

Phil Gaston is an Irish songwriter.

He was born in Belfast, Northern Ireland, moved to London in the 1970s and later moved back to Ireland.

He was the manager for Shane MacGowan's first band, the Nips.

He wrote "Navigator" for The Pogues, "Tommy's Blue Valentine" for Pride of the Cross (a band that included future Pogues Cait O'Riordan and Daryl Hunt), "Hell or England" (a track on the b-side of the 12" version of The Men They Couldn't Hang single "Greenback Dollar", also available on the CD version of the Night of a Thousand Candles album), and the lyrics for both "The Lights Of Little Christmas" and "Game Over" for Sean Tyrrell.

According to a posting in a discussion forum at pogues.com (see below), the Limerick Leader printed, in 2001, that "His work has been recorded by...Agnes Bernelle,...Ron Kavana, and has been included on albums alongside pieces from Sir Peter Maxwell Davis, Tom Waits, Wederkind and poet Adrian McGough."
