= Richard Parker (mutineer) =

English sailor (1767–1797)

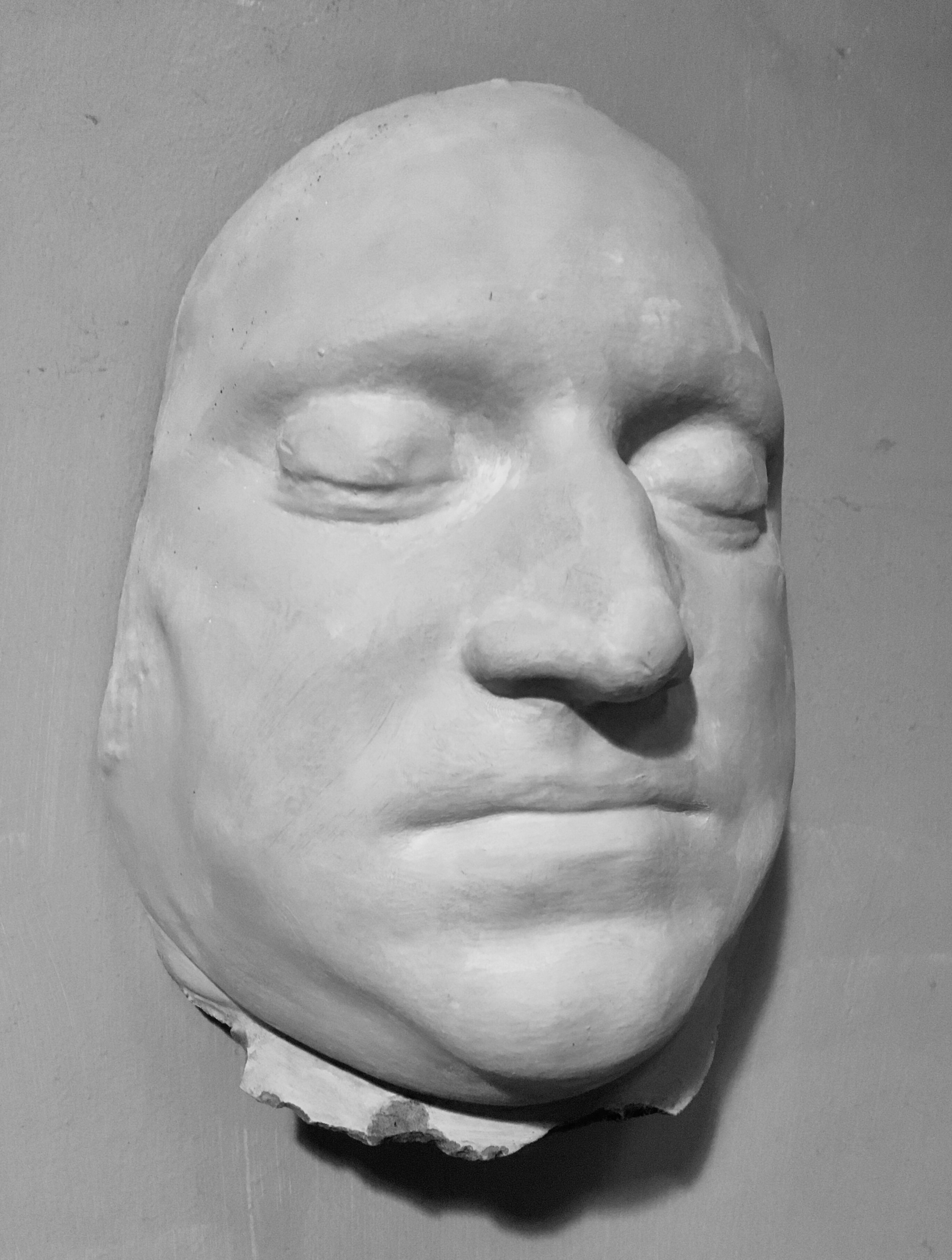
- A death mask of Parker taken shortly after his death
- Born: 16 April 1767; Exeter, Devon, England
- Died: 30 June 1797 (aged 30); HMS Sandwich, off Sheerness, Kent, England
- Burial place: St Mary Matfelon, Whitechapel
- Military career
- Allegiance: Great Britain
- Branch: Royal Navy
- Service years: 1782–1794, 1797
- Rank: Seaman

Richard Parker (16 April 1767 – 30 June 1797) was an English sailor executed for his role as president of the so-called "Floating Republic", a naval mutiny in the Royal Navy which took place at the Nore between 12 May and 16 June 1797.

== Early life and career ==
He was born on 16 April 1767, in Exeter, to a successful baker, and was apprenticed as a navigator in 1779. From 1782 until 1793, he served on various ships of the Royal Navy mainly in the Mediterranean and India service, achieving the rank of master's mate and a probationary period as lieutenant. In December 1793, he was serving as a midshipman aboard HMS Assurance when he refused an order to clear away his hammock at daybreak. The clearing of hammocks was a common obligation of ordinary seamen but was less routinely demanded of petty officers. Parker's refusal to follow the order led to a court-martial for insubordination and a reduction to the rank of seaman. He was eventually discharged from the Navy in November 1794.

Parker returned to Exeter to reunite with his wife Anne. He struggled to earn a living and was jailed for outstanding debts in early 1797. After three weeks in jail, he accepted a quota of £20 in return for re-enlistment in the Navy. His despair at the prospect was such that he attempted suicide on the way to the embarkation point at Sheerness by flinging himself overboard.

== The Nore mutiny ==
Upon his arrival at the Nore, one of the bases of the North Sea fleet, Parker was assigned to HMS Sandwich, which was widely regarded as one of the worst in terms of its squalid and overcrowded conditions. It was on the Sandwich, on 12 May 1797, that the Nore mutiny broke out; Parker played no role in organising the mutiny, but he was soon invited by the mutineers to join their ranks, and was subsequently appointed "President of the Delegates of the Fleet".

His degree of control over the direction of the mutiny was limited; his role as president was largely symbolic, mainly involving supervision of the processions of delegates in boats that plied between the involved ships for communication and morale purposes. Despite the chaotic nature of the mutiny and his ill-defined powers, Parker did manage to exert control, as on 2 June when the sloop HMS Hound arrived at the Nore and was boarded by a party of delegates. The Hound's crew and commander violently resisted this intrusion, but Parker's arrival and display of authority quickly convinced the captain to submit and join the mutiny. During the mutineers' blockade of the Thames, only ships bearing a pass signed by Parker were allowed to pass without being stopped and searched.

=== Crisis and collapse ===
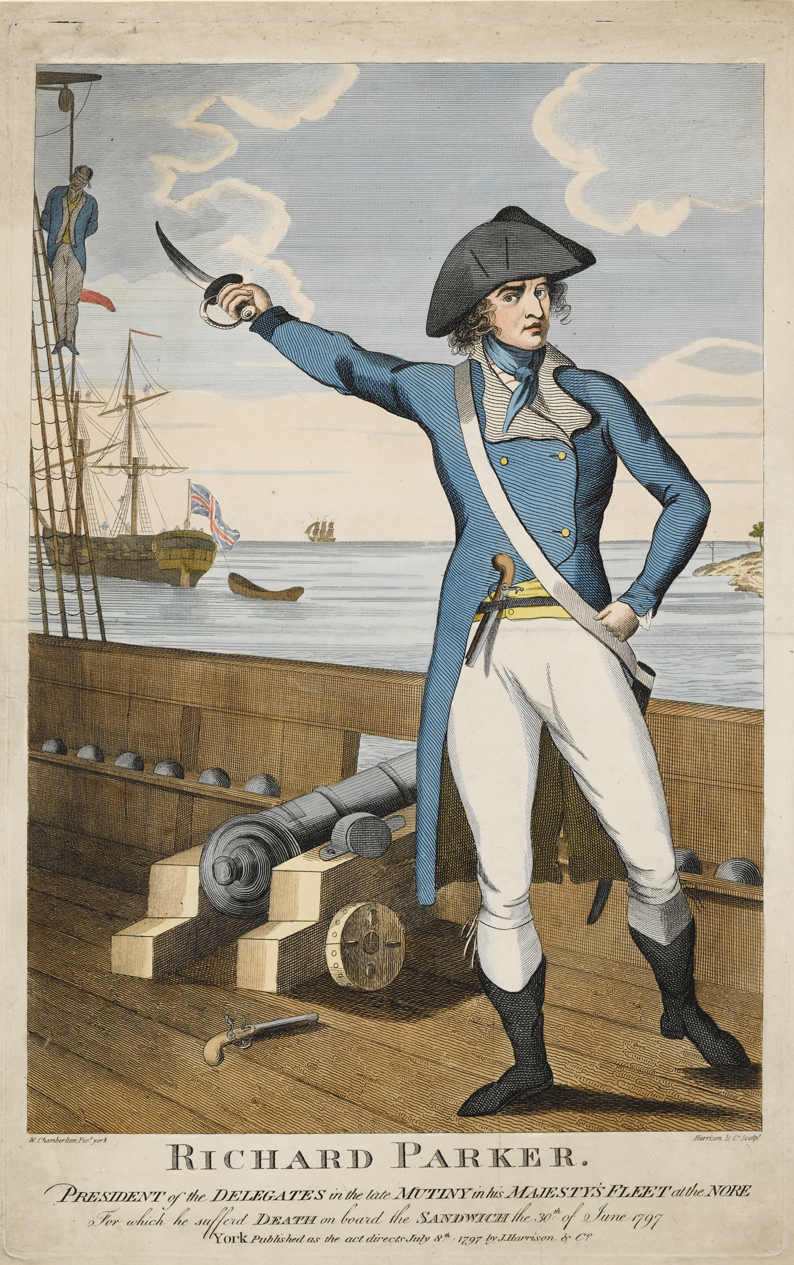
Illustration of a living Parker pointing to his hanged corpse

On 6 June, he organised a meeting of the delegates with Lord Northesk to whom he handed a petition and a form of ultimatum that their grievances be addressed within a period of 54 hours, after which he warned "such steps by the Fleet will be taken as will astonish their dear countrymen". The increasing tension led to the desertion of the mutiny by several ships, and even some of the radical delegates began to sense the end and fled abroad. The fear that the by now thoroughly demonised Parker would also escape led to a reward of £500 (equivalent to £50,000 in present-day terms) being posted for his arrest.

When the delegates' deadline passed without reply, Parker ordered that the fleet sail for Texel on the morning of 9 June. However, no ship moved when the signal to sail was given and the mutiny was effectively over. Parker was arrested on 13 June, brought briefly to Sheerness under heavy guard, then taken to HMS Neptune, the flagship of Commodore Sir Erasmus Gower, where he was court-martialled, found guilty of treason and piracy and sentenced to death. He was executed on board the Sandwich amid much ceremony on 30 June 1797.

His body was not publicly gibbetted after death, contrary to the wishes of George III. Parker's wife Anne, who had worked tirelessly to prevent his execution, later rescued his body from an unconsecrated burial ground and smuggled it into London, where crowds gathered to see it. After receiving Christian rites, it was buried in the grounds of St Mary Matfelon Church, Whitechapel. An entry in the Burial Register for St Mary's, Whitechapel (aka St Mary Matfelon), dated 4 July 1797, reads: "Richard Parker – Sheerness, Kent – age: 33 – Cause of death: Execution – This was Parker the President of the mutinous Delegates on board the Fleet at the Nore. He was hanged on board HMS Sandwich on the 30th Day of June."

== Legacy ==
The seafaring novels The Narrative of Arthur Gordon Pym of Nantucket (1838) by Edgar Allan Poe and Life of Pi (2001) by Yann Martel each feature a character named Richard Parker, who briefly serves as an antagonist to the narrator (however, Life of Pi potentially took the name from another Richard Parker who was a victim of cannibalism while stranded on a lifeboat in 1884).

A song entitled The Death of Parker was collected at St Merryn, Cornwall, in 1905.

Parker's story was the subject of the folk-punk song The Colours by the Men They Couldn't Hang. The song is sung from Parker's point of view, exploring his last thoughts as he is led to the scaffold.

A radio play, The Floating Republic, by Paul Bryers was broadcast on BBC Radio 4 on Saturday 4 December 1982. Richard Parker was played by (actor) Brian Cox.

Richard Parker also appears in the book Mutiny by Julian Stockwin, part of the author's Thomas Kydd series.
