= The Master and Margarita (miniseries) =

2005 Russian television miniseries

- Russian DVD cover
- Written by: Mikhail Bulgakov
- Screenplay by: Vladimir Bortko
- Directed by: Vladimir Bortko
- Starring: Anna Kovalchuk; Aleksandr Galibin; Oleg Basilashvili; Vladislav Galkin; Sergey Bezrukov
- Theme music composer: Igor Kornelyuk
- Country of origin: Russia
- No. of seasons: 1
- No. of episodes: 10

Production
- Running time: 10 x 52 minutes

Original release
- Network: Telekanal Rossiya
- Release: 19 December – 28 December 2005

The Master and Margarita (Russian: Мастер и Маргарита, romanized: Master i Margarita) is a Russian television mini-series produced by Russian television channel Telekanal Rossiya. based on the novel of the same name, written by Soviet writer Mikhail Bulgakov between 1928 and 1940. Vladimir Bortko directed this adaptation and was also its screenwriter. The series tagline is "Manuscripts do not burn!".

== Background ==
This was Bortko's second attempt to make a screen adaptation of Bulgakov's masterpiece. In 2000 he had already been solicited by the Kino-Most film studio, associated with competing channel NTV; but at the last moment Kino-Most did not reach an agreement with Sergei Shilovsky, grandson of Mikhail Bulgakov's third wife Elena Sergeevna Shilovskaya, the self-declared owner of the copyrights. In 2005, Telekanal Rossiiya reached an agreement with Shilovsky.

This TV-epopee of more than eight hours was heavily criticized, or at least regarded with much skepticism. The first broadcast on December 19, 2005, was preceded by months of controversy in the media. Opponents feared that filming the work for television would sacrifice the layered narrative of the novel and the complexity of the socio-political and metaphysical themes to the popular demands of the broadcast medium. Director Bortko followed the dialogues of the novel carefully, and the series became the most successful series ever on Russian television. Most of the criticism stopped after the first appearance on screen. On December 25, 2005, 40 million Russians watched the seventh episode.

Despite the fact that the city of Moscow plays an important role in the novel, director Vladimir Bortko opted to shoot the 1930s scenes in Saint Petersburg. “Saint Petersburg today is much more like Moscow in the Stalin period than Moscow today,” he said. The biblical scenes were shot in Bulgaria and in Crimea.

Unlike previous screen adaptations, director Vladimir Bortko followed the novel meticulously. The setting of a TV-series appeared to be an ideal format to elaborate the complicated, multidimensional work with many different characters. “Bulgakov wrote the novel almost like a screenplay”, Bortko said.

== The story ==
=== Three layers ===
The film is an adaptation of the novel The Master and Margarita written by the Russian author Mikhail Bulgakov. Three story lines are interwoven.

- The first story is a satire of the 1930s in the 20th century, the period during which Joseph Stalin was in power in the Soviet Union. The devil Woland comes to Moscow to have his annual Spring Ball of the Full Moon. Together with his demonic suite, he challenges the corrupt lucky ones, bureaucrats, and profiteers of that period in an hilarious way..
- The second story line is set in the biblical Yershalaim, and describes the inner struggle of Pontius Pilate before, during, and after the conviction and execution of Yeshua Ha Nozri.
- The third layer tells the love story between a nameless writer, called the Master, in Moscow in the 1930s and his lover Margarita. The Master has written a novel about Pontius Pilate, a subject which was taboo in the officially atheistic Soviet Union.

=== Differences from the novel ===
Despite the length of the TV series, several scenes and characters from the novel were not included in this adaptation.

- The most notable of the absent characters are doctor Kuzmin and the demon Abaddon.
- The most notable of the absent scenes is The Dream of Nikanor Ivanovich, in which Bulgakov denounces, through the dream of a protagonist, the show trials in the Soviet Union. Vladimir Bortko replaced this scene with an assembly of authentic Soviet propaganda films from that period.

== Trivia ==
- Vladimir Bortko did not like the voice of actor Aleksandr Galibin, who played the role of the Master. Galibin's voice is not heard in the film. Instead, his lines were dubbed using the voice of Sergey Bezrukov, the actor who played the role of Yeshua. But there were more voices dubbed by other actors. To mention only the most important ones: the role of Aloisy Mogarych was played by actor Gennadi Bogachov, but we hear the voice of actor Andrei Tolubeyev. And Aphranius, played by Lithuanian actor Liubomiras Laucevičius, got the voice of Oleg Basilashvili, the actor who played Woland.
- In the series, the dialogue from chapter 5 between the characters «near the cast-iron fence of Griboedov's» about the quality of the restaurant at the writer's house is not conducted by the characters Amvrosy and Foka. Vladimir Bortko replaced them with the characters of Grigory Rimsky and Styopa Likhodeev.
- Director Vladimir Bortko made an historical mistake in this TV series. In episode 5, we hear the foxtrot Цветущий май [tsvetushchi may] or Blossoming May coming from the cellar of the master. This foxtrot, written by composer Artur Moritsevich Polonsky (1899-1989), was not released until 1948. So Bulgakov, who died in 1940, could not have known it
- Some of the actors who appear in this TV series also appeared in the film The Master and Margarita made by Yuri Kara. Aleksandr Filippenko (Azazello in Bortko's production) is Koroviev in Kara's film, while Valentin Gaft, who plays the roles of both Caiaphas and the chief officer of the secret police in Bortko's miniseries, is Woland in Kara's film. Oleg Basilashvili (Woland) played Vladimir Talberg in Vladimir Basov's film The Days of the Turbins, and Roman Kartsev (Maksimilian Poplavsky) was Schwonder in Vladimir Bortko's screen adaptation of Heart of a Dog
- A main theme of The Master and Margarita, death under mysterious circumstances, remains very topical. Several deaths that have occurred, since the filming of the miniseries, among actors who played roles in it feed the idea for many Russians that a curse rests upon those who participate in a film adaptation of The Master and Margarita, and this idea is fiercely debated even today. But some events are not reported accurately. Some media report that the 29-year-old daughter of Valentin Gaft (Kaifa) would have hanged herself shortly after the filming. But that's not exact: Olga's body was discovered on August 24, 2002, three years before the filming of the series. An overview of all sudden and suspected deaths after the recordings of the TV series can be found on the Master and Margarita website.
- An important element of the novel is the fact that the master has no name. But when, in episode 8 of this series, Behemoth returns the manuscript of the novel to the master, we see the title page of the manuscript with the name of the author - Maksudov Nikolay Afanasievich. That is the name of the main character from Bulgakov's Theatrical Novel, which was translated in English as Black Snow, and which was also given to the master by director Aleksandar Petrović in the film The Master and Margaret from 1972.

== Production ==
- General Producers: Anton Zlatopolsky, Valery Todorovsky
- Produced by Telekanal Rossiya in collaboration with Goskino
- VFX: Lesta Studio
- Special effects: Behemoth Studio St. Petersburg
- Special effects: Trigraph

== Cast ==
- Oleg Basilashvili as Woland
- Aleksandr Galibin as the Master (voiced by Sergey Bezrukov)
- Anna Kovalchuk as Margarita
- Kirill Lavrov as Pontius Pilate
- Sergey Bezrukov as Yeshua
- Aleksandr Abdulov as Koroviev
- Aleksandr Filippenko as Azazello
- Aleksandr Bashirov as Behemoth (voiced by Semen Furman)
- Vladislav Galkin as Ivan Bezdomny
- Tania U as Hella
- Dmitry Nagiyev as Judas Iscariot / Baron Meigel
- Liubomiras Laucevičius as Aphranius
- Aleksandr Adabashyan as Berlioz
- Gennadi Bogachyov as Aloisy Mogarych
- Valentin Gaft as Caiaphas / Lavrentiy Beria
- Semyon Strugachyov as Levi Matvei
- Valeri Zolotukhin as Bosoy
- Vasily Livanov as Professor Stravinsky
- Roman Kartsev as Poplavsky
- Ilya Oleynikov as Rimsky
- Aleksandr Pankratov-Chyorny as Likhodeyev
- Valentin Smirnitsky as Sempleyarov
- Ivan Krasko as the taxi driver

== Soundtrack ==
Igor Kornelyuk
01. Titles - 2:04
02. Invisible and Free - 4:57
03. The Execution - 5:20
04. Do you like My flowers? - 2:40
05. Sabbath - 6:55
06. Waltz - 3:48
07. Garden of Gethsemane - 3:31
08. Woland's theme - 3:40
09. Love Leaped Out in Front of Us - 4:47
10. Azazello's Cream - 1:47
11. Even the Moon Gives Him No Peace - 4:01
12. The Great Ball at Satan's - 12:02
13. More About Love - 6:58
14. Maestro! Hack Out a March! - 1:47

Total time: 61:29 min.

== More screen adaptations ==
- Charlotte Waligòra - Le maître et Marguerite - 2017 (film)
- Giovanni Brancale - Il Maestro e Margherita - 2008 (film)
- Vladimir Bortko - Master i Margarita - 2005 (TV series)
- Ibolya Fekete - A Mester és Margarita - 2005 (film)
- Sergey Desnitsky - Master i Margarita - 1996 (film)
- Yuri Kara - Master i Margarita - 1994 (film)
- Paul Bryers - Incident in Judea - 1991 (TV-film)
- Oldřich Daněk - Pilát Pontský, onoho dne - 1991 (film)
- Andras Szirtes - Forradalom Után - 1990 (film)
- Aleksandr Dzekun - Master i Margarita - 1989 (TV series)
- Maciej Wojtyszko - The Master and Margarita (1988 TV series)
- Vladimir Vasilyev and Boris Yermolaev - Fuete - 1986 (film)
- Aleksandar Petrović - Il Maestro e Margherita - 1972 (film)
- Andrzej Wajda - Pilate and Others - 1972 (TV-film)
- Seppo Wallin - Pilatus - 1970 (TV-film)

To be expected

- Logos Film Company - The Master and Margarita - 2018 (film)
- Katariina Lillqvist - Mistr a Markétka - 2013 (animation film)
- Nikolai Lebedev - Master i Margarita - 2019 (film)
