= Pilate and Others =

1972 West German film

- Movie poster
- Based on: The Master and Margarita by Mikhail Bulgakov
- Written by: Andrzej Wajda
- Directed by: Andrzej Wajda
- Starring: Wojciech Pszoniak; Jan Kreczmar; Daniel Olbrychski
- Music by: Johann Sebastian Bach (St Matthew Passion)
- Country of origin: West Germany
- Original language: German

Production
- Producers: Günther Lüdecke; Andrzej Wajda
- Cinematography: Igor Luther; Pfeffer Sam
- Editor: Joanna Rojewska
- Running time: 90 minutes
- Production company: ZDF

Original release
- Network: ZDF
- Release: 29 March 1972

Pilate and Others (German: Pilatus und andere - Ein Film für Karfreitag) is a 1972 German drama film written and directed by Andrzej Wajda, based on the 1967 novel The Master and Margarita by the Soviet writer Mikhail Bulgakov, although it focuses on the parts of the novel set in biblical Jerusalem.

The film has the subtitle Ein Film für Karfreitag (English: The Film for Good Friday) because it was released on March 29, 1972, on the eve of Easter. It was also shown at the Berlin Film Festival on February 15, 2006, when director Andrzej Wajda received an Honorary Golden Bear.

== Background ==
Andrzej Wajda had already received two scripts from Warsaw to make a movie about the Passion but he had rejected both of them. After reading The Master and Margarita, he decided to use Mikhail Bulgakov's dialogues in his film.

Shooting took place in Nuremberg, among the ruins of the Third Reich. Wajda used the platform from which Adolf Hitler held his speeches when he was addressing the Nazi Party in Nuremberg.

== Story ==
In the novel The Master and Margarita by the Russian author Mikhail Bulgakov, on which the film is based, three story lines are interwoven: a satirical story line in which Satan, called Woland here, goes to the city of Moscow in the 1930s to deal with the corrupt lucky ones, bureaucrats and profiteers from the Stalin era; a second one describing the internal struggle fought by Pontius Pilate before, during and after the conviction and execution of Yeshua Ha Nozri (Jesus from Nazareth); and a third telling the story of the love between the master, an unnamed writer in Moscow during the 1930s and his beloved Margarita, who goes to the extreme to save her master. The master has written a novel about Pontius Pilate, and is addressed by the authorities because this was an issue which in the officially atheistic Soviet Union was taboo.

The film Pilate and Others only tells the biblical story of the novel: the story of Pontius Pilate and Jesus.

=== Differences from the novel ===
The biblical story of the novel is situated in Jerusalem, but Wajda transferred it to Germany in the present time. Levi Matvei is a modern TV reporter who makes reports from Golgotha; Yeshua Ha-Nozri passes Way of the Cross on streets of Frankfurt.

== Cast ==
- Wojciech Pszoniak as Yeshua Ha-Nozri
- Jan Kreczmar as Pontius Pilate
- Daniel Olbrychski as Levi Matvei
- Andrzej Łapicki as Aphranius
- Marek Perepeczko as Marcus
- Jerzy Zelnik as Judah of Kiriaf
- Vladek Sheybal as Caiaphas
- Andrzej Wajda as reporter

== Soundtrack ==
Johann Sebastian Bach – Matthäus-Passion

== Other screen adaptations of The Master and Margarita ==
- Aleksandar Petrović – Il Maestro e Margherita – 1972 (film)
- Vladimir Vasilyev and Boris Yermolaev – Fuete – 1986 (film)
- Maciej Wojtyszko – Mistrz i Małgorzata – 1988 (TV series)
- Aleksandr Dzekun – Master i Margarita – 1989 (TV series)
- Andras Szirtes – Forradalom Után – 1990 (film)
- Paul Bryers – Incident in Judaea – 1991 (TV film)
- Oldřich Daněk – Pilát Pontský, onoho dne – 1991 (film)
- Yuri Kara – Master i Margarita – 1994 (film)
- Sergey Desnitsky – Master i Margarita – 1996 (film)
- Vladimir Bortko – Master i Margarita – 2005 (TV series)
- Ibolya Fekete – A Mester és Margarita – 2005 (film)
- Giovanni Brancale – Il Maestro e Margherita – 2008 (film)
- Scott Steindorff – The Master and Margarita – 2012 (film)
- Rinat Timerkaev – Master i Margarita – 2012 (animated film)
- Mikhail Lokshin – The Master and Margarita – 2024 (film)
