= Silver Town =

Silver Town or Silvertown may refer to:

- Silvertown, London
- Silver Town, a district of Khayelitsha, Cape Town
- Silver Town, a district of Rainbow City, Panama
- Silver Town (album), by The Men They Couldn't Hang
