= Shane Bradley =

Shane Bradley might refer to:

- Shanne Bradley (born 1957), English musician
- Shayne Bradley (born 1979), English footballer
