= James Fearnley =

English musician (born 1954)

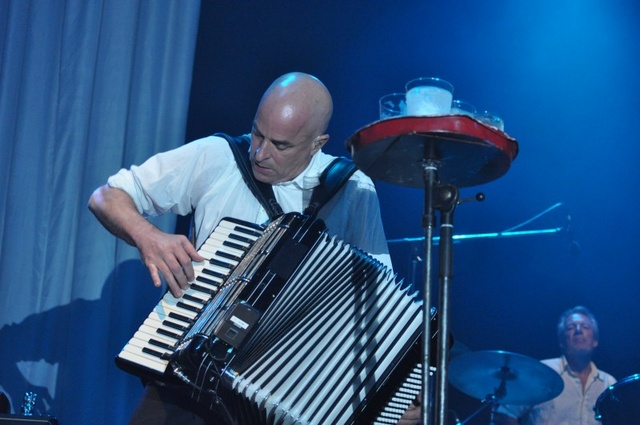
- James Fearnley, Zenith, Munich, 07-06-2011 with the Pogues (photo: Zuzana Pernicová)

Background information
- Born: James Fearnley; 9 October 1954 (age 72)
- Origin: Worsley, Lancashire, England
- Genres: Celtic punk; folk punk
- Occupations: Musician; composer
- Instruments: Accordion; guitar; mandolin; piano
- Years active: 1977–present
- Member of: The Pogues
- Formerly of: The Nipple Erectors

James Fearnley (born 9 October 1954, in Worsley) is an English musician. He plays accordion in the Pogues.

== Life and career ==
As a child he was a choir treble before his voice changed at the age of sixteen. He took piano lessons but did not enjoy them, so he chose to learn the guitar instead. He played with the singer Nik Wade and later with The Mixers, a band based in Teddington. Fearnley became the guitarist in the last iteration of Shane MacGowan's band The Nipple Erectors.

The group then consisted of Shane MacGowan on vocals, Shanne Bradley on bass and Jon Moss on drums. When The Nips disbanded at the end of 1980, Fearnley joined the soul band The Giants. Fearnley was asked by Moss if he wanted to become a permanent member of a band in which he sometimes played, Culture Club. Due to a misunderstanding, Fearnley never joined Culture Club, and shortly after this the band went on to fame.

Fearnley sold his guitar and spent a year writing a novel. In 1982, MacGowan and Jem Finer were seeking an accordion player for their latest project, The Pogues. MacGowan knew that Fearnley had taken piano lessons and believed that he might be able to play the accordion too. Finer turned up at Fearnley's flat with an accordion in a laundry bag and persuaded him to give it a try. Fearnley was nicknamed 'maestro' because he could tune the instruments. Thus, he joined The Pogues, with whom he played for many years.

In 1989, he married actress Danielle von Zerneck and moved to Los Angeles, California. He and Danielle have two daughters, Martha and Irene. Fearnley left The Pogues in 1994 due to the band's heavy touring schedule, and to spend more time with his family. He rejoined the band following its reunion in 2001.

He was a founding member of The Low And Sweet Orchestra, who released their debut album of Spaghetti Western-styled ballads, Goodbye To All That, in 1996. This group consisted of former Thelonious Monster vocalist Mike Martt, Circle Jerks' Zander Schloss (guitar), the brothers Kieran and Dermot Mulroney (violins, cello, dobro), Tom Barta (bass) and Will Hughes (drums).

Fearnley has appeared as a guest musician on albums with Talking Heads (Naked), David Byrne, Julia Fordham, Steve Earle, Dylan Walshe and Melissa Etheridge (Yes I Am), among others.

In 1995, he wrote the score for the film God's Lonely Man, which was released in January 1996.

Fearnley plays accordion, guitar, foot-operated snare drum and sings with Cranky George, 'a band of one-man-bands', with Dermot Mulroney (cello, guitar, mandolin, foot-operated cymbal and hi-hat, and vocals), Kieran Mulroney (violin, ukuleles, guitars, foot-operated cowbell), Brad Wood (bass, hat-box bass-drum and vocals) and Sebastian Sheehan (percussion).

On 12 January 2012, he released his first single, "Hey Ho". It was recorded with John King of Dust Brothers.

His memoir, Here Comes Everybody: The Story of the Pogues, was published by Faber and Faber on 19 April 2012 in the UK.

In June 2019 Fearnley, alongside Flogging Molly's Ted Hutt and Marc Orrell of Dropkick Murphys, announced the formation of a new supergroup, The Walker Roaders. Their debut record was released on 23 August 2019.
