= Night of a Thousand Candles =

Album by The Men They Couldn't Hang

Studio album by The Men They Couldn't Hang
- Released: 1985
- Recorded: Elephant Studios, Wapping.
- Genre: Roots rock, Folk-rock, Folk-punk
- Length: 37:07
- Label: Demon
- Producer: Nick Lowe, Harold Burgen, Philip Chevron, Tony Poole

The Men They Couldn't Hang chronology
Night of a Thousand Candles (1985)	How Green Is The Valley (1986)

Singles from Night of a Thousand Candles
- 1. "The Green Fields of France" Released: 1984; 2. "Ironmasters" Released: 1985; 3. "Greenback Dollar" Released: 1985

Night of a Thousand Candles is the first studio album by the band The Men They Couldn't Hang. It was released in 1985 on vinyl and cassette format, and then on CD format in 1987. The cassette version has two additional tracks, and the CD version has six bonus tracks added. Tracks from the album were performed before its release during the John Peel sessions on July 14, 1984, and January 22, 1985. Their cover version of Eric Bogle's, "The Green Fields of France" reached number 3 on John Peel's festive 50 in 1984 and "Ironmasters", the second single from the album, reached number 11 in 1985. The album also came 10th on Melody Maker's End Of Year Critic Lists 1985.

== Personnel ==
The Men They Couldn't Hang

- Shanne Bradley – bass guitar, Tibetan anus flute
- Stefan Cush (a.k.a. Cush) – vocals, guitar
- Jon Odgers – drums, percussion
- Philip Odgers (a.k.a. Swill) – vocals, guitar, tinwhistle, melodica
- Paul Simmonds – guitar, bouzuki, keyboards

Additional musicians

- Tom Keane – Bagpipes, Uilleann Pipes
- Lindsey Lowe – trumpet

Production

- Harold Burgen – Tracks 12 & 13
- Nick Lowe – Track 11
- Philip Chevron – Tracks 4, 5, 6, 10 & 14
- Tony Poole – Tracks 1, 2, 3, 7, 8, 9, 16

Engineer

- Nick Robbins

Photography

- David Howell

== Track listing ==
Original Side 1
No.	Title	Writer(s)	Lead vocals	Length
1.	"The Day After"	Philip Odgers	Swill, Cush	2:41
2.	"Jack Dandy"	Paul Simmonds	Swill, Cush	2:24
3.	"A Night to Remember"	Philip Odgers	Swill	3:14
4.	"Johnny Come Home"	Paul Simmonds	Swill	2:26
5.	"The Green Fields of France"	Eric Bogle	Cush	6:29

Original Side 2
No.	Title	Writer(s)	Lead vocals	Length
6.	"Ironmasters"	Paul Simmonds	Swill, Cush	4:11
7.	"Hush Little Baby"	Paul Simmonds	Swill, Cush	4:22
8.	"Walkin' Talkin'"	Philip Odgers	Swill, Cush	2:25
9.	"Kingdom Come"	Paul Simmonds	Swill, Cush	3:09
10.	"Scarlet Ribbons"	Paul Simmonds	Cush, Swill	5:55

Additional Tracks on CD version
No.	Title	Writer(s)	Lead vocals	Length
11.	"Greenback Dollar"	Hoyt Axton	Cush, Swill	2:37
12.	"The Bells"	Paul Simmonds	Cush, Swill	2:19
13.	"Hell or England"	Philip Gaston	Cush	1:42
14.	"The Men They Couldn't Hang"	Paul Simmonds, Philip Odgers, Shanne Bradley, Stefan Cush	Swill, Cush	2:27

Additional Tracks on CD and cassette version
No.	Title	Writer(s)	Lead vocals	Length
15.	"Donald Where's Your Troosers?"	Andy Stewart	Cush, Swill	2:01
16.	"Rawhide"	Ned Washington	Cush, Swill	2:19
