= Ian Hogg (actor) =

English actor (born 1937)

- Born: 1 August 1937 (age 89); Newcastle upon Tyne, England
- Education: Royal Central School of Speech and Drama
- Occupation: Actor
- Years active: 1967–present

Alexander Ian Hogg (born 1 August 1937) is an English actor.

== Early life ==
Alexander Ian Hogg was born in Newcastle upon Tyne, the son of Ena Mary (Robinson) and Walter Alexander Hogg, a doctor. He was educated at Durham School and Durham University (St John's College), where he graduated in 1959 with a Bachelor of Arts degree. He then studied at the Central School of Speech and Drama under the direction of Yat Malmgren and later joined the Royal Shakespeare Company. He has an older sister called Thelma Hogg (Hoggie).

== Television, film and stage ==
Hogg is best known for his lead role in the BBC1 television series Rockliffe's Babies and its follow-up Rockliffe's Folly, playing Detective Sergeant Alan Rockliffe. He has played many television roles, appearing as Purishkevich in the film Rasputin: Dark Servant of Destiny (1996), as Mike Cherry in EastEnders (1999), and as Alois Hitler in Hitler: The Rise of Evil (2003). Other television roles include the BBC's second dramatisation of Charles Dickens' Bleak House (1985) as Inspector Bucket, and Doctor Who as the villain Josiah Samuel Smith in the serial Ghost Light (1989). He continued an association with Doctor Who by voicing the part of General Voshkar in The Sandman, a spin-off audio drama produced in 2002 by Big Finish Productions. In 2002, he played the role of Ian Lane in the second episode of the first series of Foyle's War, entitled "The White Feather".

Hogg played a chechaquo (newcomer) to the Yukon in To Build A Fire, the film of Jack London's short story, in 1969. He played the role of Edmund in Peter Brook's 1971 film version of Shakespeare's King Lear, and his other film credits include Marat/Sade (1967), Tell Me Lies (1968), The Last Valley (1971), The Hireling (1973), Dead Cert (1974), Hennessy (1975), The Legacy (1978), Lady Jane (1986), Little Dorrit (1987), and The Pleasure Principle (1992).

In the summer of 2008, Hogg played in repertory in Scarborough, North Yorkshire, at the Stephen Joseph Theatre, under the artistic direction of Alan Ayckbourn. In 2010, Hogg appeared as the sensitive protagonist Murray in the Student Academy Award-nominated short, The Miserables. He played Sam in the drama film Sink (2018).
