= Stephen Finlay =

British actor

- Born: 30 November 1956; Bolton, England, UK
- Died: 14 February 2004 (aged 47)
- Occupation(s): Actor, writer, artist

Stephen Finlay (30 November 1956 – 14 February 2004) was an English actor, writer and artist. He trained as an artist at the Camberwell School of Arts and Crafts and then as an actor at the Central School of Speech and Drama in London. He is the son of actor Frank Finlay.

== Actor ==
Film and television credits include: The Jokers, AD, What Is The Capital of Madagascar?, The Pleasure Principal, The Return of the Soldier, Sons and Lovers, The Pickwick Papers, Coriolanus, Elizabeth Alone and The Bill. In the theatre, Stephen appeared in Nicholas Nickleby for the Royal Shakespeare Company, An Ideal Husband, All My Sons, Hunting Stuart, DeathTrap, The Promise, The White Scourge, The Will and many other plays.

== Writer ==
As a writer his first play, The Games Rule (co-written with John Wheatley) was performed in the Royal Shakespeare Company Festival in Stratford-upon-Avon. Subsequent productions include the King's Head, The New Inn, Watermans Arts Centre, The Chelsea Centre, The Edinburgh Festival, and the Brighton Festival. The Games Rule has been performed as far away as Sydney, Australia. Other plays include Richer in Spirit, The Ironing Board Man and Screaming Inside. The radio adaptation of Screaming Inside was Awarded the 1999 Independent Radio Drama Award and was broadcast with Stephen playing the lead role of Stuart Pearce. The inaugural stage production was in the 2012 Brighton Fringe Festival by the Brighton Theatre Collective starring Shane Armstong and featuring the voices of Frank Finlay, Cathy Finlay and James Coombes. It was directed by Daniel Finlay. The production won an Argus Angel Award and was nominated for best new play by New Writing South. Other writing includes: Aftermath for Japanese television, The River – a film short and The Treehouse Gang – a children's TV adventure story.

== Artist ==
Finlay worked in a variety of mediums but is best known for his works with Cow Parade these pieces include "Beefeater – It Ain't Natural" and "Ermintrude", both were part of the 60 most spectacular cows of Cow Parade London 2002. Both were sold at a gala auction to benefit Child Line on 10 October 2002 at Sotheby's Olympia.
