= Rosalind Bennett =

English actress

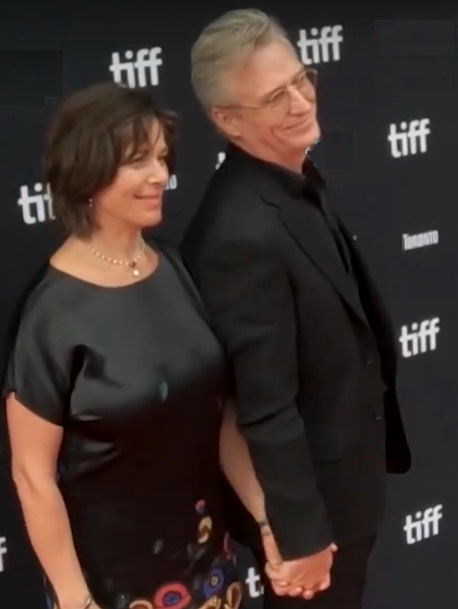
- Bennett with husband Linus Roache at Tiff 2022
- Born: Rosalind Sophia Bennett; Rochdale, Lancashire, England
- Occupation: Actress
- Years active: 1980–1999
- Spouse: Linus Roache (m. 2002)
- Relatives: William Roache (father-in-law); Anna Cropper (mother-in-law); James Roache (half-brother-in-law)

Rosalind Sophia Bennett is an English former stage and television actress.

Bennett was born in Rochdale, Lancashire, and trained at The Drama Centre, she went on to a number of stage, television and screen roles. Her film appearances included Miss Pickwick in American Roulette and Eleanor in Restoration. Television roles included an appearance in six episodes of Coronation Street in 1986. Bennett's stage roles include Mary in Juno and the Paycock at the National Theatre. She appeared as Zoe in the Tales of the Unexpected episode (9/5) "The Facts of Life" (1988).

== Personal life ==
She married fellow actor Linus Roache in Malvern Hills, Worcestershire, in 2002.

== Filmography ==
=== Film ===
Year	Title	Role	Notes
1988	Vroom	Lyn	
1988	American Roulette	Pickwick	
1989	Dealers	Bonnie	
1995	Innocent Lies	Janet Blain	
1995	Restoration	Eleanor	
1996	Guardians	Carol Reed	

=== Television ===
Year	Title	Role	Notes
1986	Coronation Street	Tina Wagstaffe	Recurring role
1987	Heart of the Country	Flora	TV miniseries
1988	Tales of the Unexpected	Zoe	"The Facts of Life"
1988	Campaign	Rose Thompson	TV miniseries
1988	The Fear	Colette	"1.2"
1989	The Manageress	Pauline Wilson	"The Management Reserves the Right"
1990	Zorro	Senora Francisca De La Pena	"Deceptive Heart"
1990	Agatha Christie's Poirot	Marie Marvelle	"The Adventure of the Western Star"
1991	Smack and Thistle	Elizabeth	TV film
1991	Incident in Judaea	Niza	TV film
1992	Growing Rich	Carmen	TV series
1992	Covington Cross	Genevieve De La Croix	"Pilot"
1992	Screen Two	Kate	"The Grass Arena"
1999	An Evil Streak	Gemma Clarkson	TV series
