= Roman Kartsev =

Russian actor and stand-up comic (1939–2018)

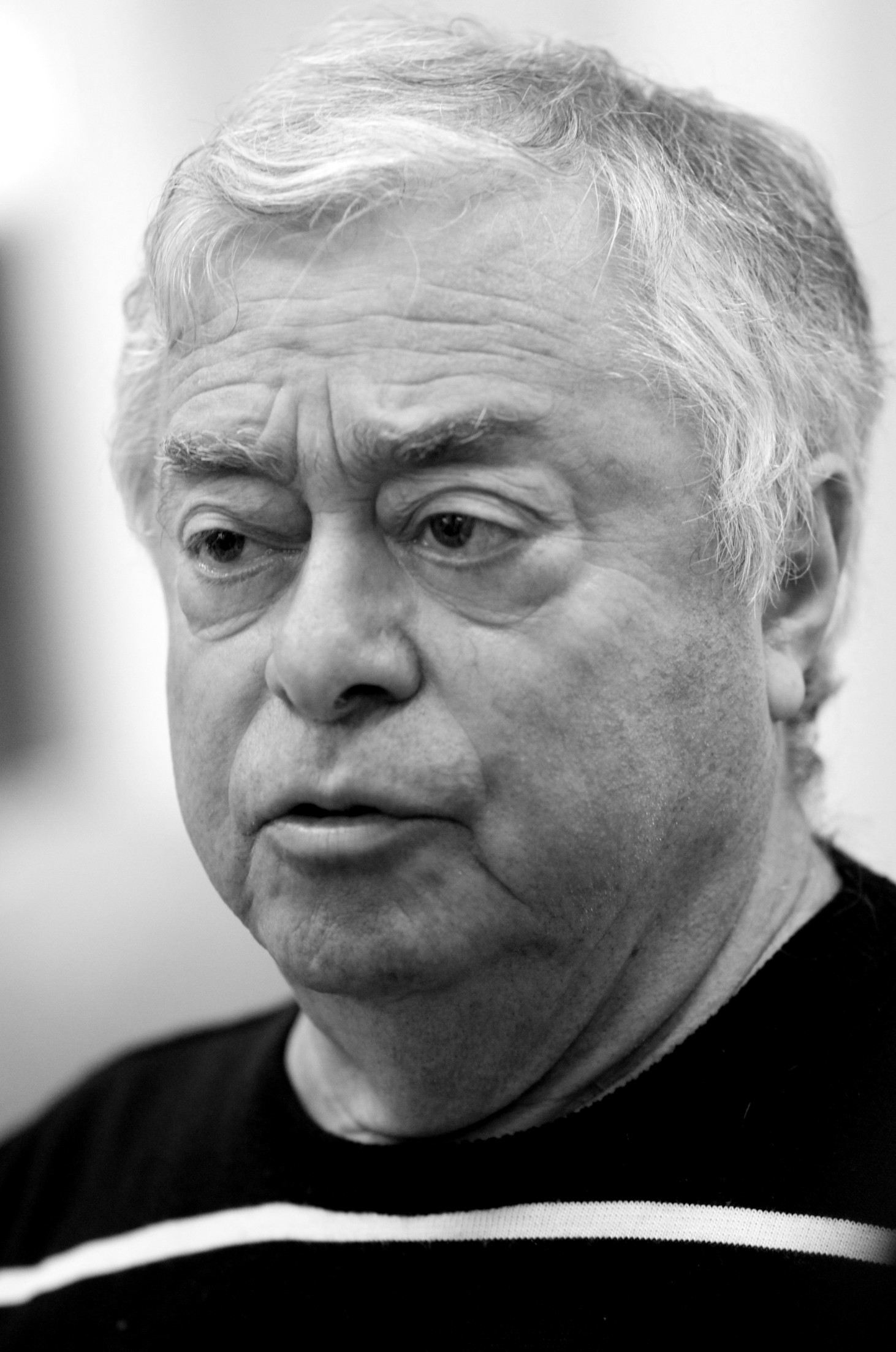
- Roman Kartsev in 2011
- Born: Roman Antshelevich Katz; 20 May 1939; Odesa, Ukrainian SSR, Soviet Union
- Died: 2 October 2018 (aged 79); Moscow, Russia
- Occupations: Actor, humorist
- Years active: 1960–2018
- Spouse: Viktoria Kassinskaya
- Awards: People's Artist of the Russian Federation (1999)
- Roman Kartsev's voice From the Echo of Moscow program, 12 May 2009

Roman Andreyevich Kartsev (Russian: Рома́н Андре́евич Ка́рцев, born Roman Antshelevich Katz (Рома́н А́ншелевич Кац); 20 May 1939 – 2 October 2018) was a Russian entertainer of stage, theater and cinema.

He was Honored Artist of the RSFSR (1990), People's Artist of the Russian Federation (1999). Actor of the Moscow Theater of Miniatures under the leadership of Mikhail Zhvanetsky. For several decades he performed in a duet with Viktor Ilchenko (Kartsev&Ilchenko).

== Biography ==
Roman Kartsev was born in Odessa to Sura-Lea (in life as Sonia) Ruvinovna Fuksman and Antshel Zelmanovich Katz. The maternal grandfather, after whom the artist was named, was a synagogue cantor. The spoken language in the family was Yiddish. Before the war, Roman lived with his parents in Tiraspol, where in 1939–1941 his father was a striker for the Tiraspol team in the second league of the USSR Football Championship. During the Great Patriotic War, together with his mother and brother was in evacuation in Omsk; the grandparents who remained in Odessa died. After the demobilization of the father in 1946, the whole family returned to Odessa.

In the early 1960s he became friends with Mikhail Zhvanetsky and Viktor Ilchenko, founders of the Parnas-2 amateur theatre in Odessa, who invited him to join the troupe.

== Filmography ==
- 1967 – Arkady Raikin (documentary) as cameo
- 1975 – Waves of the Black Sea as entrepreneur
- 1977 – The Magic Voice of Gelsomino as School Teacher
- 1979 – Dumas in the Caucasus as Lefer
- 1985 – A Long Memory as Uncle Yasha
- 1985 – Goldfish (TV performance) as cameo
- 1988 – Heart of a Dog as Schwonder
- 1989 – The Evil Spirit as Shcherbaty
- 1989 – The Bindler and the King as Lazar Boyarsky
- 1991 – Promised Heaven as Solomon
- 1992 – Apartment (mini-series) as Henry Ivanovich Valenchik
- 1993 – Prediction as patriot and anti-communist
- 2000 – Old Hags as Joseph Lazovsky
- 2005 – The Master and Margarita as Maximilian Andreevich Poplavsky, Berlioz's Uncle
- 2008 – Smile of God, or Purely Odessa Story as Mikhail Perelmuter
- 2010 – In the Style of Jazz as Odesa taxi driver
