= Growing Rich =

1992 British TV miniseries

- Genre: Comedy drama Fantasy; Horror
- Based on: Growing Rich by Fay Weldon
- Written by: Fay Weldon
- Directed by: Brian Farnham
- Starring: Martin Kemp; John Stride; Rosalind Bennett; Claire Hackett; Caroline Harker; Jacqueline Tong; Barry Jackson; Maggie Steed; Pearce Quigley; Tony Haygarth; Annie Hayes; Tim Preece; Mark Kingston; Anthony Cairns
- Music by: Dominic Muldowney
- Countries of origin: United Kingdom; Australia; New Zealand
- Original language: English
- No. of series: 1
- No. of episodes: 6

Production
- Executive producers: Brenda Reid (United Kingdom); Don Reynolds (New Zealand)
- Producer: Roger Gregory
- Production locations: Norwich, Norfolk, England, UK; Auckland, New Zealand
- Editor: Rosy Williams
- Camera setup: Jules Greenway
- Running time: 52 minutes
- Production companies: Anglia Films; South Pacific Pictures; Australian Broadcasting Corporation

Original release
- Network: ITV
- Release: 28 February – 3 April 1992

Growing Rich is a British-New Zealand six-part fantasy horror comedy-drama miniseries written by Fay Weldon based on a tie-in novel, also written by Fay Weldon, was published on 20 February 1992. The show starred Martin Kemp, John Stride and Rosalind Bennett. It was produced by Anglia Films in association with South Pacific Pictures and Australian Broadcasting Corporation and aired on the ITV network between 28 February and 3 April 1992.

== Plot ==
The series stars Martin Kemp who plays a sinister driver (who is in fact the Devil) and gets involved with the lives of three women.

== Cast ==
- Martin Kemp as The Driver
- John Stride as Sir. Bernard Bellamy
- Rosalind Bennett as Carmen
- Claire Hackett as Annie
- Caroline Harker as Laura
- Jacqueline Tong as Mavis
- Barry Jackson as Alan
- Maggie Steed as Raelene
- Pearce Quigley as Woodie
- Tony Haygarth as Andy
- Annie Hayes as Audrey
- Tim Preece as Kim
- Mark Kingston as Mr. Bliss
- Anthony Cairns as Stephen

== Episodes ==
No.	Title	Directed by	Written by	Original release date
1	"So You Want a Short Cut?"	Brian Farnham	Fay Weldon	28 February 1992
Three young girls desperate to escape the rural rut of life in a small East Anglian town are just like any other teenagers, but when Carmen has a chance meeting with the devil, the fate of all three girls becomes sealed.
2	"Work Isn't School You Know"	Brian Farnham	Fay Weldon	6 March 1992
The three girls are without A-levels, but the Driver promises that if Carmen gives herself to Sir Bernard, they will all share in good fortune.
3	"One Oyster's Worth"	Brian Farnham	Fay Weldon	13 March 1992
Three years after the Driver doomed Carmen to the chicken factory, Annie is now in New Zealand and Laura is soon to have her third child. The Driver now returns, looking for Carmen.
4	"The Deal Was Dinner"	Brian Farnham	Fay Weldon	20 March 1992
Carmen promises to dine with Sir Bernard, while Annie and Laura are finding that life is getting them down.
5	"You Need Your Friends"	Brian Farnham	Fay Weldon	27 March 1992
Laura tries to find a way to defeat the Driver now that Carmen has been made to pay for breaking her promise.
6	"Mrs. Baker's Best Girls"	Brian Farnham	Fay Weldon	3 April 1992
The Driver apparently has won. Carmen is to be a sacrificial virgin to Sir Bernard to see that Annie receives and that Laura keeps her family together.

== Reception ==
Louisa Mellor says a mixed reviews: "Tim Curry had played the devil in 1985 Tom Cruise fantasy Legend – the VHS tape of which was on our living room shelf – but in Fay Weldon's six-part 1992 drama Growing Rich, the role was Kemp's. Both men clearly made the same erotic imprint on my 11-year-old brain, so it had duly saved them under the same mental heading: devils, hot. No further investigation required".

== Home media ==
A heavily edited version of the series with 3 hours and 20 minutes was released on VHS by Focus Entertainment on 10 October 1992.
