= The Codes =

1966 Polish film

- Directed by: Wojciech Has
- Written by: Andrzej Kijowski
- Starring: Jan Kreczmar; Zbigniew Cybulski; Irena Eichlerówna
- Cinematography: Mieczysław Jahoda
- Edited by: Zofia Dwornik
- Music by: Krzysztof Penderecki
- Release date: 1966
- Running time: 80 minutes
- Language: Polish

The Codes (Polish: Szyfry) is a Polish film released in 1966, directed by Wojciech Has.

== Plot ==
Tadeusz (Jan Kreczmar) is a Polish veteran of World War II who fled to London at the end of the war, leaving behind his wife Zofia (Irena Eichlerówna) and two sons, Maciek (Zbigniew Cybulski) and Jedrek, who disappeared when he was 17 years old.

Tadeusz returns to Kraków to discover if Jedrek may be alive. His wife and son Maciek were members of resistance – was it possible that the second son may have been the traitor?

During Maciek's struggle to explain to his father their history during German occupation, questions arise concerning collaboration with the Gestapo and retribution by the Home Army. Has pictures the mystical lost boy in a dark fairy-tale forest, full of the war's ghosts and wholesale executions.

== Cast ==
- Jan Kreczmar as Tadeusz
- Zbigniew Cybulski as Maciek
- Ignacy Gogolewski as Doctor Gross
- Irena Horecka as Aunt Helena
- Janusz Klosinski as Antiquary
- Adam Dzieszynski as Receptionist in 'Hotel Polski'
- Irena Eichlerówna as Zofia
- Janusz Gajos as White monk
- Barbara Krafftówna as Jadwiga
- Zofia Merle as Forester's daughter
- Kazimierz Opaliński as Pieczara
- Irena Orska as Neighbor

== See also ==
- Cinema of Poland
- List of Polish-language films
