= Mikhail Zhvanetsky =

Soviet and Ukrainian writer (1934–2020)

Mikhail Zhvanetsky PARF, PAU
- Михаил Жванецкий
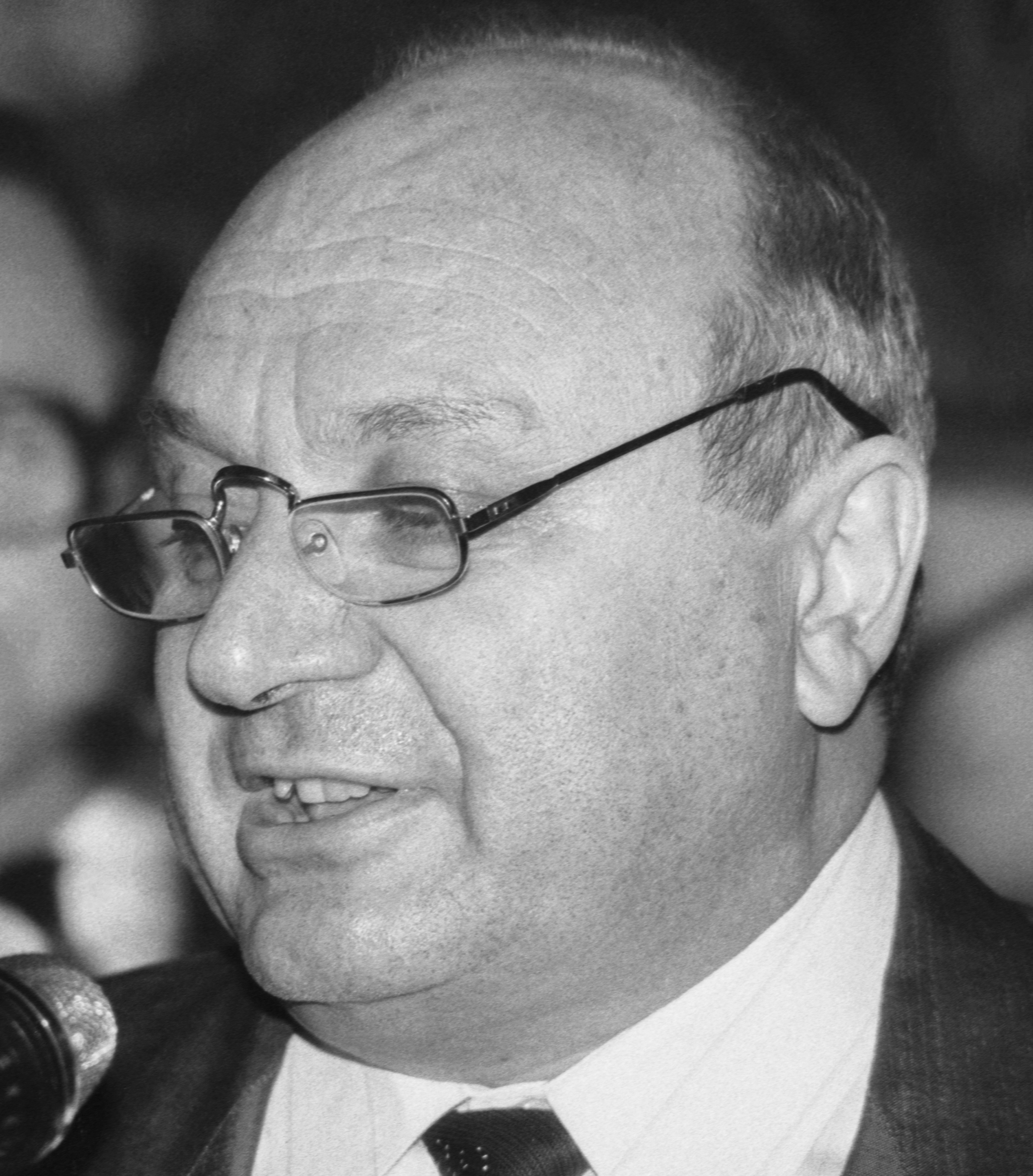
- Zhvanetsky in 1992
- Born: Mikhail Manyevich Zhvanetsky (Russian: Михаил Маньевич Жванецкий); 6 March 1934; Odesa, Ukrainian SSR, Soviet Union (now Ukraine)
- Died: 6 November 2020 (aged 86); Moscow, Russia

Comedy career
- Genre: Satire
- Website: jvanetsky.ru

Mikhail Mikhaylovich Zhvanetsky (Russian: Михаи́л Миха́йлович Жване́цкий; 6 March 1934 – 6 November 2020) was a Soviet writer, satirist and performer of Jewish origin, best known for his shows targeting different aspects of the Soviet and post-Soviet everyday life.

== Biography ==
Zhvanetsky was born in Odesa, Ukrainian SSR, Soviet Union. His father, Mane (Emmanuel) Moiseevich Zhvanetsky, was a surgeon; his mother, Raisa Yakovlevna Zhvanetskaya, was a dentist. After the beginning of the Great Patriotic War in 1941, his father was drafted into the army as a medical worker; he received the Order of the Red Star in 1942. The family returned to Odesa from evacuation after the liberation of the city in 1944. Mikhail Zhvanetsky studied at secondary school 118 for boys.

He continued his studies at the Odessa National Maritime University. He began his literary activity by writing plays and monologues for the Odessa amateur theater “Parnas-2”, which he founded together with his friend Victor Ilchenko. In 1964 Raikin invited him to join his troupe as head of the literary section. He then began to read his works on stage, first at the Odessa Philharmonic, then at the Hermitage Theatre.

He joined the Union of Soviet Writers in 1978 and wrote several books.

In 1988, he founded the Theater of Miniatures in the Tverskoy district of Moscow, where he worked as artistic director.

In 2001, his writings were published in a four-volume collection.

From 2002 to 2019, he hosted the monthly humorous program “Guardian of the Country” on the TV channel “Russia 1”.

His monologues and sketches were performed by Arkady Raikin, Roman Kartsev and Viktor Ilchenko.

== Death ==
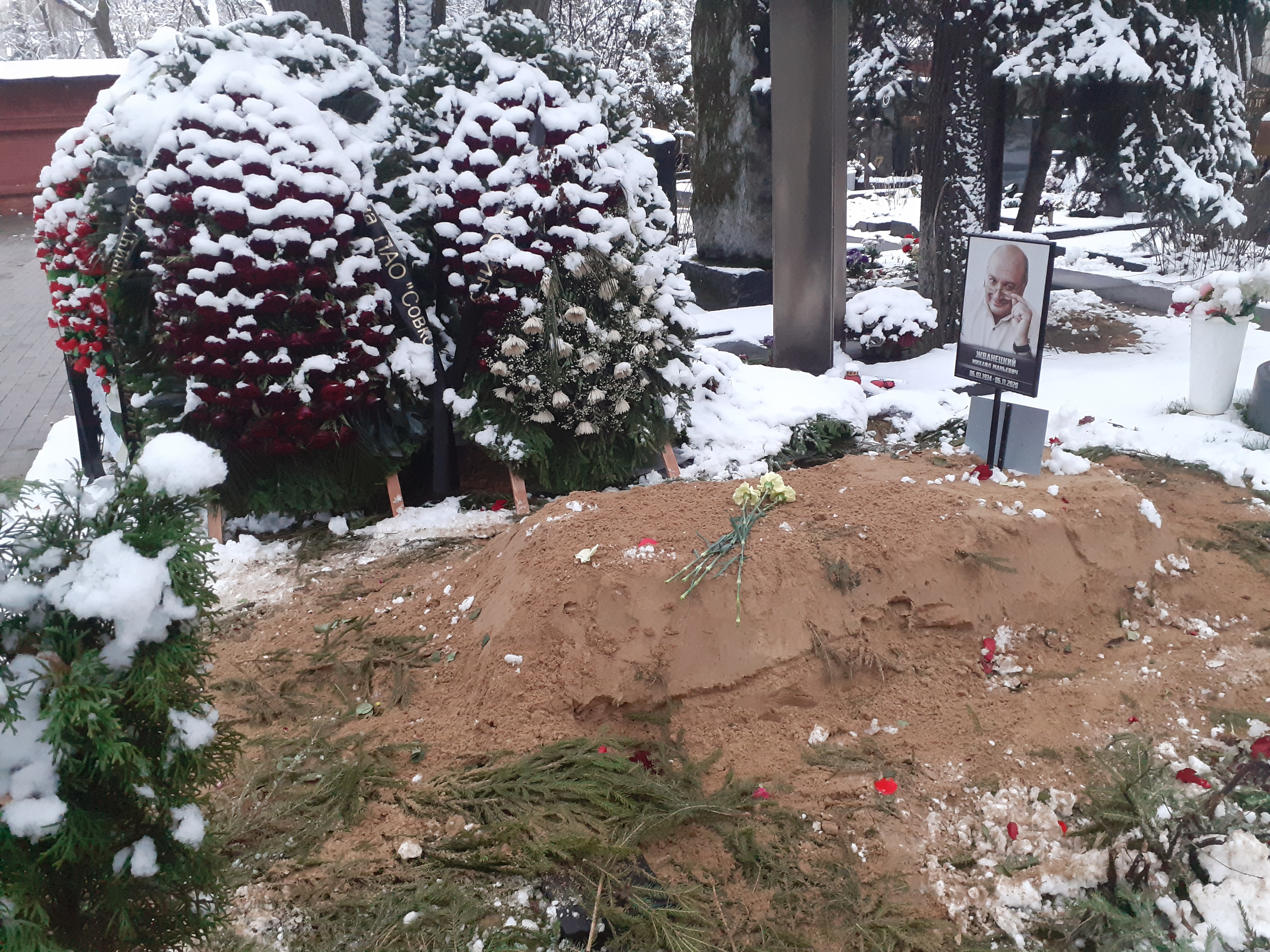
Mikhail Zhvanetsky's grave in November 2020.

Zhvanetsky died in Moscow at the age of 86. According to his director and literary secretary, Oleg Stashkevich, the causes of death were old age and illness.

He was buried with military honors on November 9, next to the graves of People’s Artists of the USSR Galina Volchek and Mark Zakharov.

Due to the COVID-19 pandemic, the farewell ceremony was held in a closed format.

A year after his death, on November 6, 2021, a monument was unveiled at the writer’s grave (sculptor: Vladimir Borisovich Soskiyev, full member of the Russian Academy of Arts).

== Awards and honors ==
Zhvanetsky was granted the following honorary titles and decorated with the following orders:

- People's Artist of Russia (2012)
- People's Artist of Ukraine (народний артист України), 1999.
- Meritorious Artist of the Russian Federation (Заслуженный деятель искусств Российской Федерации), 2001
- Merited Artist of the Autonomous Republic of Crimea, Ukraine (заслужений діяч мистецтв Автономної Республіки Крим), 2002
- Russian Order of Merit for the Fatherland, fourth class, by President Medvedev on Zhvanetsky's 75th birthday in 2009.
- President of the International Club of Odesa
- Order of Friendship of Peoples (1994)
- Independent prize "Triumph" (1994)
- Member of the Writers' Union (1978–1991)
- Honorary Citizen of Odesa (1994)
- Member of the Presidium of the Russian Jewish Congress
- Breastplate of the Foreign Ministry of Russia "for contribution to international cooperation"

Boulevard of the Arts in Odesa was renamed Boulevard Zhvanetsky (5 April 2009).

A minor planet, 5931 Zhvanetskij, discovered on April 1, 1976, is named after him (using different transliteration of the surname).
