= Lynsey Baxter =

British actress

- Born: 7 May 1959 (age 67); West Ham, London, England
- Occupation: Actress
- Years active: 1974–present

Lynsey Baxter (born 7 May 1959) is an English actress.

She was born in London on 7 May 1959. She began as a child actress in 1974, and later trained at Royal Academy of Dramatic Art (RADA). She has worked in theatre, television, film, radio, and voiceover.

Baxter trained in reflexology in 1998, while appearing in the television series Dangerfield, and in her spare time worked in hospitals. She was also reported to be a trained remedial masseuse and transpersonal counsellor.

== Filmography ==
=== Film ===
| Year | Title | Role | Notes |
|---|---|---|---|
| 1981 | The French Lieutenant's Woman | Ernestina | |
| 1984 | Real Life | Jackie | |
| 1988 | The Girl in the Swing | Barbara | |
| 1992 | The Pleasure Principle | Sammy | |
| 1994 | The Trial of Lord Lucan | Lady Lucan | |
| 1996 | The Cold Light of Day | Milena Tatour | |
| 2003 | The Bone Hunter | Henini | |
| 2003 | The Gospel of John | Mary Magdalene | |
| 2005 | Can't Stop Breathing | Louise | Short |

=== Television ===
| Year | Title | Role | Notes |
|---|---|---|---|
| 1974 | The Little Match Girl | Little Match Girl | TV film |
| 1976 | Peter Pan | Jane | TV film |
| 1976 | Operation Patch | Betsy Cosserat | TV series |
| 1976 | Dickens of London | Orfling | TV miniseries |
| 1978 | The Prime of Miss Jean Brodie | Sandy Stranger | TV series |
| 1978 | The Devil's Crown | Isabella of Angoulême | Recurring role |
| 1983 | To the Lighthouse | Nancy Ramsay | TV film |
| 1983 | Agatha Christie's Partners in Crime | Lois Hargreaves | "The House of Lurking Death" |
| 1984 | Horizon | Margaret Howard | "The Intelligence Man" |
| 1984 | Tales of the Unexpected | Jane | "Accidental Death" |
| 1984 | The Gentle Touch | Sally Wyatt | "Mad Dog" |
| 1987 | Succubus | Jane | TV film |
| 1987 | Screen Two | Mariella | "Hedgehog Wedding" |
| 1988 | The Ray Bradbury Theater | Katherine | "Punishment Without Crime" |
| 1988 | Screenplay | Elizabeth | "Starlings" |
| 1988 | Bust | Sarah Sturgis | "Love Bait" |
| 1989 | After the War | Felicity Hale | "Love and Kisses" |
| 1989 | Goldeneye | Wren Lieutenant | TV film |
| 1989 | Saracen | Juliet Isted | "Decoy" |
| 1989 | Act of Will | Jane Sedgewick | "1.4" |
| 1989 | Snakes and Ladders | Serena | "1.5", "1.6", "1.7" |
| 1990 | Bergerac | Joanna Carter | "Roots of Evil" |
| 1990 | Chancer | Victoria Douglas | 13 |
| 1991 | Zorro | Rosalinda de la Fuente | "The Devil's Fortress: Parts 1 & 2" |
| 1991 | 4 Play | Zoe | "Seduction" |
| 1991 | Clarissa | Arabella "Bella" Harlowe | TV miniseries |
| 1992 | Screen Two | Madalena | "The Grass Arena" |
| 1992 | Natural Lies | Lucy | "1.1", "1.2", "1.3" |
| 1992 | Boon | Karen Verdi | "Queen's Gambit" |
| 1993 | The Mushroom Picker | Clea | TV miniseries |
| 1993 | The Darling Buds of May | Jasmine Brown | "Cast Your Pearls Not Before Swine: Part 2" |
| 1993 | The Comic Strip Presents... | Helen Wilson | "Queen of the Wild Frontier" |
| 1993 | The Young Indiana Jones Chronicles | Margaret Trappe | "Young Indiana Jones and the Phantom Train of Doom" |
| 1993 | Remember | Danielle | TV film |
| 1994 | I Spy Returns | Santina | TV film |
| 1994 | Broken Lives | Duchess of Beaufort | TV film |
| 1994 | Without Walls | Lucrezia Borgia | "Lucrezia Borgia Reveals All" |
| 1994 | The Trial of Lord Lucan | Lady Lucan | TV film |
| 1995 | Le blanc à lunettes | Lady Makinson | TV film |
| 1995 | Bugs | Sally | "Manna from Heaven" |
| 1996 | Casualty | Sarah Leonard | "Chain Reactions" |
| 1996 | Pie in the Sky | Sasha Wilkes | "New Leaf" |
| 1997 | Harry Enfield's Television Programme | Miss Baxter | "2.3" |
| 1997 | Bramwell | Laura Talbot | "3.7" |
| 1998 | Dangerfield | Beth Saunders | Recurring role |
| 1999 | An Evil Streak | Catherine Mereday | "1.1", "1.2", "1.3" |
| 1999 | Psychos | Dr. Karen Smith | TV miniseries |
| 2000 | Gormenghast | Cora Groan | TV miniseries |
| 2000 | Peak Practice | Kate Turner | Recurring role |
| 2001 | Doc Martin | Petronella | TV film |
| 2001 | Judge John Deed | Dr. Helena Bellew | "Hidden Agenda" |
| 2002 | Manchild | Marilyn | "Four of a Kind" |
| 2003 | Hardware | Jean | "Naked" |
| 2003 | Doc Martin and the Legend of the Cloutie | Petronella | TV film |
| 2003 | Absolute Power | Virginia Harcourt | "Country Life" |
| 2004 | Rosemary & Thyme | Marcia Pearson | "Orpheus in the Undergrowth" |
| 2005 | The Walk | Stephanie | TV film |
| 2005 | Murder in Suburbia | Mary Soukis | "Viva La Salsa" |
| 2005 | Egypt | Sarah Belzoni | TV miniseries |
| 2006 | Mayo | Sandra | "1.4" |
| 2006 | Rebus | Belinda | "The Black Book" |
| 2006 | Blue Murder | Claire Wray | "Make Believe" |
| 2010 | Lewis | Ursula Van Tassel | "Falling Darkness" |

== Theatre ==
| Year | Title | Role | Notes |
|---|---|---|---|
| 1974 | Next of Kin | Lucy Lloyd | National Theatre |
| 1975 | Heroes | The Girl | Royal Court |
| 1977 | As You Like It | Phoebe | Royal Shakespeare Company |
| 1977 | The Cherry Orchard | Anya | Nottingham Playhouse |
| 1978 | The Dance of Death | Judith | |
| 1979 | You Never Can Tell | Dolly | Lyric Theatre |
| 1979 | The Master Builder | Hilde Wangel | |
| 1979 | Brimstone and Treacle | Pattie | Open Space |
| 1980 | Romeo and Juliet | Juliet | African Tour |
| 1981 | Heartbreak House | Ellie Dunn | Royal Exchange |
| | Aunt Dan and Lemon | Mindy | Royal Court Theatre & New York |
| 1981 | Total Eclipse | Matilde Verlaine | Lyric Theatre |
| | The Lady from the Sea | Hilde Wangel | Royal Exchange, Manchester |
| | The Dance of Death | Judith | Royal Shakespeare Company |
| 1994 | Les Parents terribles | Madeleine | National Theatre |
| | A Flea in Her Ear | Eugenie | Nottingham Playhouse |
| | The Devil's Disciple | The Girl | Royal Shakespeare Company |
| | The Zycoys | Styopka | Royal Shakespeare Company |

== Radio ==
- Kind Hearts and Coronets, BBC Radio (1995), as Sibella
- Abelard and Heloise, BBC Radio (1999)

== Awards ==
- Most Promising Newcomer, Plays and Players Award
- Best Actress, Monte-Carlo Film and Television Festival 1991, as Elizabeth in ScreenPlay: Starlings (1988).
