= Pogo A Go Go! =

Compilation album by Various
- Released: 1986
- Genre: Punk rock, new wave
- Label: New Musical Express
- Compiler: Roy Carr, Paolo Hewitt, Danny Kelly, Gavin Martin, David Swift, Adrian Thrills, David Quantick

Various chronology
Pogo A Go Go! (1986)	C86 (1986)

Pogo A Go Go! is a cassette album released by NME magazine in 1986 (later released as a CD NME RE 501), reflecting on the punk/new wave era. It contains some rare or unreleased tracks by well-known artists such as the Sex Pistols, the Clash, Elvis Costello and the Attractions and the Stranglers as well as less known artists such as the Nipple Erectors (who included the pre-Pogues Shane MacGowan), Victim and Johnny Moped.

== Track listing ==
=== Side one ===
1. Sex Pistols - "Satellite (Suburban Kid)" (previously unreleased version)
2. The Undertones - "True Confessions"
3. Nipple Erectors - "King of the Bop"
4. Television Personalities - "Part Time Punks"
5. Sham 69 - "Borstal Breakout"
6. The Damned - "Stretcher Case Baby"
7. Elvis Costello and The Attractions - "Watching the Detectives" (demo version)
8. The Stranglers - "Choosey Susie"
9. Victim - "Strange Thing by Night"

=== Side two ===
1. The Clash - "1977" (demo)
2. Johnny Moped - "Incendiary Device"
3. The Slits - "Typical Girls"
4. Alternative TV - "Love Lies Limp"
5. Swell Maps - "Read About Seymour"
6. The Jam - "In the City"
7. The Fall - "Bingo Masters Break Out"
8. Subway Sect - "Ambition"
9. Wire - "Dot Dash"
10. Buzzcocks - "Orgasm Addict"
