= An Evil Streak =

British television psychological drama, written by Andrea Newman

- Genre: Psychological drama Thriller
- Written by: Andrea Newman
- Directed by: Edward Bennett
- Starring: Trevor Eve; Rosalind Bennett; Richard Dillane; Lynsey Baxter; Adrian Rawlins; Gemma Jones; Lolly Taylor; Jackson Leach; Ann Firbank
- Composer: Stanislaus Syriewicz
- Country of origin: United Kingdom
- Original language: English
- No. of series: 1
- No. of episodes: 3

Production
- Executive producer: Jo Wright
- Producer: Simon Passmore
- Cinematography: John Hooper
- Editor: Andrew McClelland
- Running time: 50 minutes
- Production company: LWT

Original release
- Network: ITV
- Release: 17 May – 31 May 1999

An Evil Streak is a three-part British television psychological drama series, created and written based on the novel by Andrea Newman published in 1977. It was directed by Edward Bennett and first broadcast on ITV for three consecutive weeks from 17 to 31 May 1999 on Mondays. It was produced by LWT for the ITV network.

== Plot ==
The series follows Gemma Clarkson (Rosalind Bennett), who has been led astray by her uncle and godfather, Alex Kyle (Trevor Eve), ever since she was a little girl. Now that she is older, his obsessive influence becomes even more sinister as he manipulates her into an extra-marital affair. A scheming uncle leads his married niece into an affair with an out of work actor. Alex is also overwhelmed by the death of his much beloved brother and hates the guts of Beatrice, his widowed sister-in-law, the mother of Gemma.

== Cast ==
- Trevor Eve as Alex Kyle
- Rosalind Bennett as Gemma Clarkson
- Richard Dillane as David Mereday
- Lynsey Baxter as Catherine Mereday
- Adrian Rawlins as Christopher Clarkson
- Gemma Jones as Beatrice Kyle
- Lolly Taylor as Stephanie Clarkson
- Jackson Leach as Jonathan Clarkson
- Ann Firbank as Consultant
- Yana Yanezic as Catherine's Model

== Episodes ==
No.	Title	Directed by	Written by	Airdate	UK viewers (million)
1	"Episode 1"	Edward Bennett	Andrea Newman	17 May 1999	8.31
Gemma has been led astray by her godfather Alex ever since she was a child. Now she is older his influence becomes more sinister as he engineers an affair for her - and relishes the role of emotional puppeteer.
2	"Episode 2"	Edward Bennett	Andrea Newman	24 May 1999	7.18
Gemma's affair is slipping out of control and David's wife warns Alex of the consequences. Gemma's mother becomes suspicious as Alex is no longer content just to watch.
3	"Episode 3"	Edward Bennett	Andrea Newman	31 May 1999	5.40
Feeling neglected by Gemma and David, Alex plans a brilliant revenge but risks losing everything.

== Home media ==
The series has never been re-broadcast or released on DVD or VHS.
