= How Green Is the Valley =

Studio album by The Men They Couldn't Hang
- Released: 1986
- Recorded: Elephant Studios, Wapping.
- Genre: Roots rock, Folk-rock, Folk-punk
- Length: 37:25
- Label: MCA
- Producer: Mick Glossop

The Men They Couldn't Hang chronology
Night of a Thousand Candles (1985)	How Green Is the Valley (1986)	Waiting for Bonaparte (1988)

Singles from How Green Is the Valley
- 1. "Ghosts of Cable Street" Released: 1986; 2. "Gold Strike" Released: 1986; 3. "Shirt of Blue" Released: 1986

How Green Is the Valley is the second studio album of The Men They Couldn't Hang. It was released in 1986 after the band were signed to MCA Records following the success of their previous album Night of a Thousand Candles. It is the last album to feature co-founder Shanne Bradley on bass guitar.

== Singles ==
Three singles were released from the album: "Gold Rush", which included "Gold Strike" on the 12" version, "Ghosts of Cable Street" and "Shirt of Blue". "Ghosts of Cable Street", a song detailing the battle of Cable Street in 1936, used actual recordings of mounted police which could be heard outside the Wapping studios as it was during the time of the Wapping Printers Strike. "Shirt of Blue" was another song, typical of The Men They Couldn't Hang writing material on British history, was the subject of the UK miners' strike (1984–1985). The video features press footage of the conflict between striking miners and the police. The cassette version is the only one to feature additional tracks which were recorded during a live performance at the Electric Ballroom in London's Camden Town.

== Personnel ==
Credits adapted from AllMusic.

The Men They Couldn't Hang

- Shanne Bradley - bass guitar
- Stefan Cush (a.k.a. Cush) – vocals, guitar, horn
- Jon Odgers – drums, percussion
- Philip Odgers (a.k.a. Swill) – vocals, guitar, tinwhistle, melodica, recorder
- Paul Simmonds - guitar, bouzuki, mandolin, lute, biscuits

Additional musicians

- Lindsey Lowe – trumpet
- Bobby Valentino – Violin

Additional personnel

- Mick Glossop – production and engineering
- Richard Haughton – album artwork
- Paul Cox – photography

== Track listing ==
Original Side 1
No.	Title	Writer(s)	Lead vocals	Length
1.	"Gold Strike"	Paul Simmonds	Instrumental	1:20
2.	"Gold Rush"	Paul Simmonds	Swill, Cush	2:03
3.	"Ghosts of Cable Street"	Paul Simmonds	Swill, Cush	3:59
4.	"Dancing on the Pier"	Paul Simmonds	Cush	2:20
5.	"The Bells"	Paul Simmonds	Cush	3:15
6.	"Wishing Well"	Nick Lowe	Cush	2:54

Original Side 2
No.	Title	Writer(s)	Lead vocals	Length
7.	"Going Back to Coventry"	Paul Simmonds	Cush	3:15
8.	"Shirt of Blue"	Paul Simmonds	Cush	4:27
9.	"Rabid Underdog"	Stefan Cush	Cush	2:12
10.	"Tiny Soldiers"	Philip Odgers	Swill	3:41
11.	"The Parade"	Paul Simmonds	Instrumental	2:12
12.	"Parted From You"	Philip Odgers	Swill	4:12

Additional Tracks on cassette version
No.	Title	Writer(s)	Lead vocals	Length
13.	"Whiskey with me Giro (live)"	Unknown	Cush
14.	"Scarlet Ribbons (live)"	Paul Simmonds	Cush
