= The Trial of Lord Lucan =

- Genre: True crime drama
- Written by: Peter Whelan
- Directed by: Richard Signy
- Country of origin: United Kingdom
- Original language: English

Production
- Executive producer: Ian McBride
- Producer: Bill Jones
- Production location: England
- Running time: 85 minutes
- Production company: Granada Television
- Budget: £1 million

Original release
- Network: ITV
- Release: 10 November 1994

The Trial of Lord Lucan is a British television film of 1994, offering a fictitious trial of the real John Bingham, 7th Earl of Lucan for the murder of Sandra Rivett in November 1974.

The first broadcast of the film on the ITV network was on 10 November 1994, timed mark the twentieth anniversary of Lucan's disappearance.

The film was written by Peter Whelan and directed by Richard Signy.

== Factual background ==
Lucan (born 1934), who was separated from his wife, vanished the day after the killing of Rivett, his children's nanny, and was never found. Starring Julian Wadham as Lucan, Lynsey Baxter as Lady Lucan, the film speculates on what might have happened if Lucan had been arrested and stood trial for the murder. In the intervening years, the whereabouts of Lucan had itself become a famous international mystery.

== Synopsis ==
After the discovery of Sandra Rivett's body, Lucan flees but is found and arrested as he boards a cross-channel ferry. Brought to trial, he pleads not guilty and gives evidence, with a story of a night of astonishing coincidences. Other key players in the real-life events also set out for the court what they know, including Dominick Elwes, a key member of Lucan's Clermont Club set.

At the end of the trial, a jury of twelve people (not actors, all were selected at random from the electoral register) arrives at its verdict.

== Cast ==
- Julian Wadham as Lucan
- Jan Ruppe as Sandra Rivett
- Lynsey Baxter as Veronica, Lady Lucan
- Sean Arnold as John Aspinall
- Anthony Head as Dominick Elwes
- Osmund Bullock as Bill Shand-Kydd
- Paul Jesson as Detective Chief Superintendent Roy Ranson
- Niven Boyd as Detective Chief Inspector Gerring
- Sheila Ruskin as Dr Margaret Pereira
- Robin Ellis as Sir Charles Moore
- James Faulkner as Sir James Hallows
- Alan Bird as Judge
- Geoffrey Annis as Clerk of the court
- Jesse Birdsall as Sergeant Baker
- Derek Smith as Professor Keith Simpson
- Stephen Tomlin as Sergeant Forsyth
- Tim Dantay as Billy Edgson
- Rowland Davies as Charles Benson
- Andrew Seear as Greville Howard
- Terry Gilligan as Sergeant at caravan site
- Olwen May as Woman Police Constable
- Rebecca Oliver as Lady Frances Bingham
- Eamonn Riley as Prison Officer
- James Thackwray as Albert Hensby
