= The Miserables =

- Directed by: Benjamin Taylor
- Written by: Alex Lipman
- Produced by: Peter Hort, Alex Lipman
- Starring: Maggie Steed, Ian Hogg
- Cinematography: Cenay Said
- Edited by: Kieran Waller
- Music by: Anne Chmelewsky
- Release date: 27 October 2010
- Running time: 20 minutes
- Country: United Kingdom
- Language: English

The Miserables is a short film (20 minutes) directed by Benjamin Taylor and written by Alex Lipman. Released in 2010 by University of Westminster, the film was a finalist at The 38th Annual Student Academy Awards in Beverly Hills, and has been screened at festivals in the UK, USA, China, Russia, Germany and Italy. The film won Best Drama at the 2011 Royal Television Society Student Awards where the short was considered by the jury to be outstanding. A very good emotional script, had been creatively executed with sensitivity, flair, restraint, and imagination.

== Plot ==
Struggling to cope with his wife Evelyn's (Maggie Steed) terminal illness, Murray Pickleton (Ian Hogg) constructs time machines out of their furniture in his efforts to relive their past and escape the present. Evelyn is skeptical, but when her doctor insists she is to be moved to a hospice, she joins her husband in remembering their life together and attempts to discuss his life after hers.

== Cast ==
- Maggie Steed – Evelyn Pickleton
- Ian Hogg – Murray Pickleton
- Henry Everett – Doctor
- Elizabeth Muncey – Alison
- Scott Ellis – George

== Awards and nominations ==
Category	Result
Student Academy Awards
Best Foreign Film	Nominated
Royal Television Society Student Awards
Best Drama	Won
International Film and Video Festival of Beijing
Audience Award	Won
International Film Festival
Best Fiction Film	Nominated
Martha's Vineyard International Film Festival
Best Film	Nominated
Screentest Student Film Festival
Best Film	Won
Best Drama	Nominated
Best Script	Nominated

== Festival screenings ==
In addition to receiving various awards and nominations, The Miserables has also been screened at many short film festivals around the world, including the following:

- 2011 – Big Sur Film Festival in California, USA.
- 2011 – IULM Film Festival in Milan, Italy.
- 2011 – No Limits Film Festival in Sheffield, UK.
- 2011 – Up and Coming Film Festival in Hannover, Germany.
- 2010 – VGIK International Film Festival in Moscow, Russia.
