= Jan Kreczmar =

Polish actor

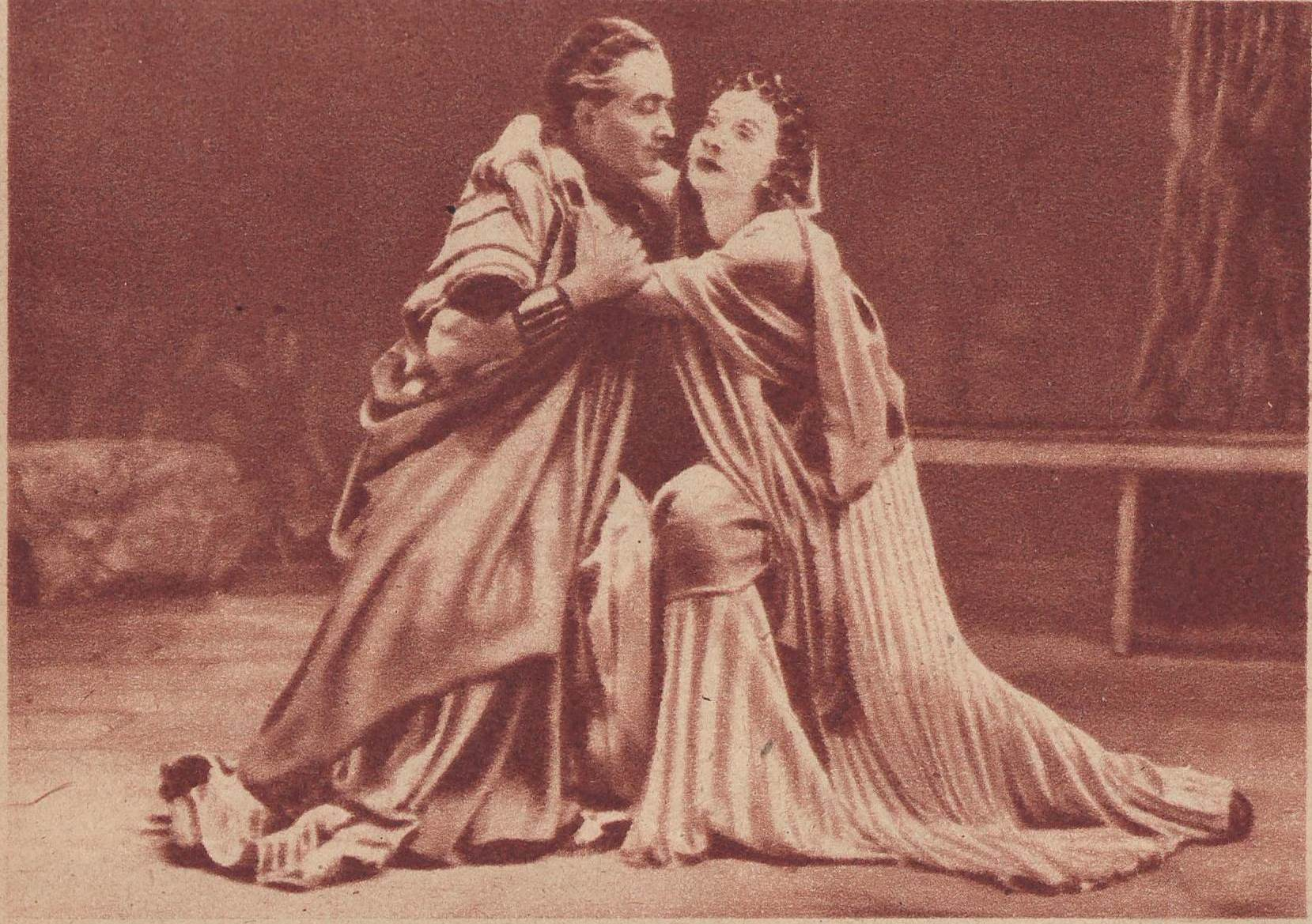
Janina Romanówna i Jan Kreczmar - Penelopa - Film nr 9-10 - 1947-01-01

Jan Kreczmar (6 May 1908 in Warsaw – 29 August 1972 in Warsaw) was a Polish theatre and film actor.

He was a rector of the National Higher School of Theatre in Warsaw in the years 1949-55 and 1956-67.

He was married to actress Justyna Kreczmarowa. Brother of the theatre director Jerzy Kreczmar.

== Filmography ==
Year	Title	Role	Notes
1938	Strachy	Dwierycz	
1939	Nad Niemnem		
1962	Rodzina Milcarków	Korfanty Wojciech	
1963	Passenger	Walter	
1963	Mansarda	Ksiaze	
1966	The Codes	Tadeusz	
1968	The Doll	Tomasz Lecki	
1971	Jeszcze slychac spiew i rzenie koni	Józef Królikiewicz	
1971	Family Life	ojciec Wita i Belli	
1971	Behind the Wall (Za ścianą)	Professor	TV movie
1972	Pilate and Others	Pontius Pilate	
