= The Pleasure Principle (film) =

1992 British film

The Pleasure Principle is a 1992 British comedy film directed by David Cohen and starring Peter Firth, Haydn Gwynne and Lysette Anthony. The screenplay concerns a modern-day Don Juan who enjoys relationships with several different women, but is still bemused by the mysteries of the opposite sex.

== Cast ==
- Peter Firth ... Dick
- Chloe Davies ... The Girl he never made it with
- Haydn Gwynne ... Judith
- Lysette Anthony ... Charlotte
- Sara Mair-Thomas ... Anne
- Sarah Campbell ... Linda
- Liam McDermott ... Clamper
- Stephen Finlay ... Policeman
- Lynsey Baxter ... Sammy
- Ian Hogg ... Malcolm
- Francesca Folan ... Mrs. Malcolm
- Gordon Warnecke ... Policeman
- Cliff Parisi ... Policeman
- Mark Carroll ... Bridegroom
- Chris Knowles ... Peter
- Lauren Tauben ... Betty
- Patrick Tidmarsh ... Yob
