= Incident in Judaea =

1991 British television film

- Based on: The Master and Margarita by Mikhail Bulgakov
- Directed by: Paul Bryers
- Starring: John Woodvine; Mark Rylance; Frank Baker; Jon McKenna; Rosalind Bennett; Lee Montague; Jim Carter; Jason Carter
- Theme music composer: Debbie Wiseman
- Country of origin: United Kingdom
- Original language: English

Production
- Running time: 95 minutes
- Budget: £230, 000

Original release
- Network: Channel 4
- Release: 31 March 1991

Incident in Judaea is a British film made by Paul Bryers, based on the novel The Master and Margarita by the Soviet author Mikhail Bulgakov. The film only adapts the biblical parts of the novel. It was broadcast by the British Channel 4 on 31 March 1991.

== Background ==
Author and director Paul Bryers wrote and directed many factually-based dramas for television, radio and theatre and adapted and directed films by famous playwrights such as Arthur Miller and Mikhail Bulgakov. His TV-film Incident in Judaea was the first drama Bryers ever directed and he considers it as one of the best experiences he's had as a director. Bryers got a limited budget of £230,000, but he could work with star actors like John Woodvine, Lee Montague and Mark Rylance.

== Story ==
In the novel The Master and Margarita by the Russian author Mikhail Bulgakov, on which the film is based, three story lines are interwoven: a satirical story line in which Satan, called Woland here, goes to the city of Moscow in the 1930s to deal in hilarious manner with the corrupt lucky ones, bureaucrats and profiteers from the Stalin era, a second one describing the internal struggle fought by Pontius Pilate before, during and after the conviction and execution of Yeshua Ha Nozri (Jesus from Nazareth), and a third one telling the story of the love between the master, an unnamed writer in Moscow during the 1930s and his beloved Margarita, which goes to the extreme to save her master. The master has written a novel about Pontius Pilate, and is addressed by the authorities because this was an issue which in the officially atheistic Soviet Union was taboo.

=== Differences from the novel ===
The film Incident in Judaea only tells the biblical story of the novel: the story of Pontius Pilate and Yeshua Ha Nozri (Jesus from Nazareth), but follows faithfully the story and the dialogues. The film starts with the first paragraph of Chapter 2 of the novel: "In a white cloak with blood-red lining, with the shuffling gait of a cavalryman, early in the morning of the fourteenth day of the spring month of Nisan, there came out to the covered colonnade between the two wings of the palace of Herod the Great' the procurator of Judaea, Pontius Pilate".

== Cast ==
- Yeshua Ha-Nozri: Mark Rylance
- Pontius Pilate: John Woodvine
- Marcus Ratslayer: Jonathon McKenna
- Matthew Levi: Frank Baker
- Aphranius: Jim Carter
- Judas from Kiriath: Jason Carter
- Joseph Kaifa: Lee Montague
- Niza: Rosalind Bennett

== Soundtrack ==
Original music score by Debbie Wiseman

== Other screen adaptations of The Master and Margarita ==
- Charlotte Waligòra - Le maître et Marguerite - 2017 (film)
- Giovanni Brancale - Il Maestro e Margherita - 2008 (film)
- Vladimir Bortko - Master i Margarita - 2005 (TV series)
- Ibolya Fekete - A Mester és Margarita - 2005 (film)
- Sergey Desnitsky - Master i Margarita - 1996 (film)
- Yuri Kara - Master i Margarita - 1994 (film)
- Paul Bryers - Incident in Judea - 1991 (TV-film)
- Oldřich Daněk - Pilát Pontský, onoho dne - 1991 (film)
- Andras Szirtes - Forradalom Után - 1990 (film)
- Aleksandr Dzekun - Master i Margarita - 1989 (TV series)
- Vladimir Vasilyev and Boris Yermolaev - Fuete - 1986 (film)
- Aleksandar Petrović - Il Maestro e Margherita - 1972 (film)
- Andrzej Wajda - Pilate and Others - 1972 (TV-film)
- Seppo Wallin - Pilatus - 1970 (TV-film)

To be expected

- Logos Film Company - The Master and Margarita - 2018 (film)
- Katariina Lillqvist - Mistr a Markétka - 2013 (animation film)
- Nikolai Lebedev - Master i Margarita - 2019 (film)
