= Maggie Steed =

English actress and comedienne (born 1946)

- Born: Margaret Baker; 1 December 1946 (age 79); Plymouth, Devon, England
- Education: Bristol Old Vic Theatre School
- Occupations: Actress; comedian
- Years active: 1970–present

Maggie Steed (born Margaret Baker; 1 December 1946) is a British actress and comedian.

== Career ==
After studying drama at the Bristol Old Vic Theatre School in Bristol in the late 1960s, Steed left the theatre for several years, until she was about 30 years old, 1976 or 1977. She stated: "Actresses in those days had to be 'dolly birds' and I was just Margaret Baker from Plymouth, tall with very gappy teeth, so I became a secretary instead. It was only years later, when I'd grown up politically and become interested in theatre, that I started again and ended up at Coventry's Belgrade Theatre with Clive Russell and Sue Johnston."

Steed has performed with the Royal National Theatre, Royal Shakespeare Company and with Belt and Braces, the political theatre troupe run by Gavin Richards as well as working as a comedian in alternative cabaret.

She was one of the first women to become involved in the alternative comedy scene when it sprang into existence in 1979, and performing at the Comedy Store, with the group Alternative Cabaret and elsewhere. Her material was personal and confessional.

Her first major television role was playing Rita Moon in the series Shine on Harvey Moon. She played Margaret Crabbe in Pie in the Sky in the mid 1990s and Phyllis Woolf in Born and Bred. Her television credits include appearances on Fox, Minder, Sensitive Skin and Jam & Jerusalem.

In 2008, Steed appeared on tour in Michael Frayn's comedy Noises Off as Mrs Clackett, produced by the Ambassador Theatre Group, which included the New Victoria Theatre, Woking. The cast included Sophie Bould, Colin Baker and Jonathan Coy. In 2010 she appeared in the short film The Miserables, and the following year onstage in a comedy duo role with actress Jackie Clune in a production of The Belle's Stratagem.

In April 2017, it was announced that Steed was joining the cast of EastEnders as Joyce Murray. It was announced in March 2018 that her character had been written out of the series and subsequently would be killed off.

== Political activism ==
Steed was active in the Campaign Against Racism in the Media. She appeared in an edition of the BBC's Open Door series on 1 March 1979 (with the academic Stuart Hall) entitled "It Ain't Half Racist, Mum", criticising British television's discussion and representation of immigration and racial stereotypes.

She helped write and perform in the comedy benefit concert An Evening for Nicaragua, at the Shaftesbury Theatre, which was shown on British television in 1983. The cast included Ben Elton, Dawn French, Jennifer Saunders, Emma Thompson and Rik Mayall. Steed visited Nicaragua in 1982 with Andy de la Tour.

== Film ==
Year	Title	Role
1980	Babylon	Woman at Lockup
1990	Blood Rights	Tess Barker
1992	Clothes in the Wardrobe	Mrs. Raffald
1992	Growing Rich	Raelene
1993	Olly's Prison	Ellen
1999	Simon Magus	Muttchen
2000	Stardom	British Fashion Reporter
2004	Lawrence of Arabia Close	Doris
2006	The Painted Veil	Mrs Garstin
2009	The Imaginarium of Doctor Parnassus	Louis Vuitton Woman
2010	The Miserables	Evelyn Pickleton
2013	A Promise	Frau Hermann
2013	Alpha: Omega	Dee
2014	Pudsey the Dog: The Movie	Mrs Willoughby
2016	Florence Foster Jenkins	Mrs O'Flaherty
2016	Juliet Remembered	Juliet
2016	A Cure for Wellness	Mrs Abramov
2017	Transformers: The Last Knight	Vivian's Grandmother
2017	Paddington 2	Mrs Gertrude Biggleswade
2019	Fisherman's Friends	Maggie
2022	Fisherman's Friends: One and All	Maggie

== Television ==
Year	Title	Role	Notes
1970	Coronation Street	Ellen Smith	4 episodes
1980	Fox	Bette Greene	5 episodes
1981	The History Man	Myra Beamish	4 episodes
1982	Minder	Sherry	Episode: "Broken Arrow"
1982	The Young Ones	Woman from Council	Episode: "Demolition"
1982-95	Shine on Harvey Moon	Rita Moon	41 episodes
1983	Crown Court	Clare Forsyth QC	3 episodes
1984	Charlie	Ella Pearce	4 episodes
1984	The Young Ones	Witch	Episode: "Sick"
1984	The Young Ones	Rosemary	Episode: "Summer Holiday"
1985-7	Victoria Wood As Seen on TV	Shopper/Marion Clune	2 episodes
1987	Intimate Contact	Becca Crichton	4 episodes
1991	Lovejoy	Joanna	Episode: "One Born Every Minute"
1991	The Gravy Train Goes East	Mrs Steadman	episode 3
1992	Red Dwarf	Dr Hildegarde Lanstrom	Episode: "Quarantine"
1992	Van Der Valk	Maria Thomp	Episode: "Proof of Life"
1992	Growing Rich	Raelene	6 Episodes
1993	Lipstick on Your Collar	Aunt Vickie	6 episodes
1994	Martin Chuzzlewit	Mrs Todgers	5 episodes
1994-7	Pie in the Sky	Margaret Crabbe	33 episodes
1997	Inspector Morse	Angela Stoors	Episode: "Death Is Now My Neighbour"
1998-2004	French and Saunders	Various	3 episodes
1999	Let Them Eat Cake	Madame Vigée-Lebrun	Episode: "The Portrait"
2000	Midsomer Murders	Rosemary Furman	Episode: "Judgement Day"
2002	Foyle's War	Margaret Ellis	Episode: "The White Feather"
2002-5	Born and Bred	Phyllis Woolf	36 episodes
2005-7	Sensitive Skin	Victoria Dawkins	6 episodes
2006	New Tricks	Rose Dyer	Episode: "Dockers"
2006-9	Jam & Jerusalem	Eileen Pike	19 episodes
2008	Midsomer Murders	Lynne Fox	Episode: "Left for Dead"
2009	Lark Rise to Candleford	Mrs Herring	1 episode
2009	My Family	Mrs Philbin	Episode: "Dog Dazed"
2010	Whites	Celia	5 episodes
2011	32 Brinkburn Street	Elizabeth	5 episodea
2012	Stella	Meg	8 episodes
2013	Midsomer Murders	Sylvia Mountford	Episode: "Schooled in Murder"
2015-7	Chewing Gum	Esther	10 episodes
2017-8	EastEnders	Joyce Murray	59 episodes
2019	Father Brown	Dorothy Parnell	Episode: "The Whistle in the Dark"
2019	Elizabeth Is Missing	Elizabeth	Television film
2022	Ten Percent	Stella Hart	8 episodes
2023	Sister Boniface Mysteries	Vivienne Bonham-Crane	2 episodes
2024	Changing Ends	Nan	Episode: "Mad Dogs and English Nans"
2024	Rivals	Lady Gosling	3 episodes
2024	Ridley	Celia Machin	2 episodes
2025	Silent Witness	Dr Harriet Maven	8 episodes

== Theatre ==
- The Heiress – as Aunt Lavinia (National Theatre) (2000)
- The Importance of Being Earnest – as Lady Bracknell (2005)
- Relative Values – as the Countess of Marshwood (Salisbury Playhouse production) (2005)
- The History Boys – replaced Frances de la Tour as Mrs. Lintott (National Theatre) (2006)
- Noises Off – as Dotty Otley (UK Touring Production) (2008)
- Hay Fever – as Judith Bliss (West Yorkshire Playhouse) (2010)
