= The Domino Club =

Studio album by the Men They Couldn't Hang
- Released: 1990
- Genre: Celtic rock, rock, pop, punk rock
- Label: Silvertone
- Producer: Pat Collier

The Men They Couldn't Hang chronology
Silver Town (1989)	The Domino Club (1990)	Alive, Alive-O (1991)

The Domino Club is an album by the British band the Men They Couldn't Hang, released in 1990. "Great Expectations" was the first single. The album peaked at No. 53 on the UK Albums Chart. The band broke up after the supporting tour.

== Production ==
The Domino Club was produced by Pat Collier. The Men They Couldn't Hang added Nick Muir on keyboards prior to the recording sessions. "Great Expectations" is about a prisoner contemplating his post-release plans. "On the Razzle" is a slice of pub life. "Handy Man" is about a recent college graduate with limited job prospects. "Industrial Town" is a cover of the Weddings Parties Anything song.

== Critical reception ==
Professional ratings
Review scores
Source	Rating
AllMusic	3/5 stars
Alternative Rock	6/10
The Encyclopedia of Popular Music	3/5 stars
Houston Chronicle	3/5 stars
Record-Journal	B−
The Vancouver Sun	4/5 stars
Winnipeg Sun	4/5 stars

The Boston Globe noted the "folk-punk, semi-Celtic sonic mix, and a sharp-eyed, literate view of life's downside" and the willingness "to sweep in for the bonding melody and big chorus." The New York Times said that the band have "chosen the freedom and authenticity of traditional Irish music over the stale dogma of rock-and-roll" while "mix[ing] in generous doses of punk energy and enough of a pop sensibility to make the music accessible to contemporary rock audiences."

The Edmonton Journal concluded, "For the uninitiated, The Domino Club's as satisfactory an album as any of the Men's past efforts. But those who have followed them for years waiting for the great leap forward won't find it here." The Independent panned the "sheer teeth-grinding boredom" of the music and noted the "wearisome spit-and-sawdust hey-nonny-no style that constitutes British folk-rock music these days."

== Track listing ==
No.	Title	Length
1.	"The Lion and the Unicorn"
2.	"Great Expectations"
3.	"The Family Way"
4.	"Handy Man"
5.	"Kingdom of the Blind"
6.	"Grave-robbing in Gig Harbour"
7.	"Industrial Town"
8.	"You're the One"
9.	"Australia"
10.	"Dogs Eyes, Owl-Meat, Man Chop"
11.	"Billy Morgan"
12.	"On the Razzle"
