= Waiting for Bonaparte =

Studio album by The Men They Couldn't Hang
- Released: 11 April 1988
- Recorded: Woodcray Manor Studios, Berkshire
- Genre: Roots rock, Folk-rock, Folk-punk
- Length: 55:00
- Label: WEA
- Producer: Mick Glossop, Ben Kape

The Men They Couldn't Hang chronology
How Green Is The Valley (1986)	Waiting for Bonaparte (1988)	Silver Town (1989)

Singles from Waiting for Bonaparte
- 1. "The Crest" Released: 1988; 2. "Island in the Rain" Released: 1988; 3. "The Colours" Released: 1988

Waiting for Bonaparte is the third studio album by The Men They Couldn't Hang. It was recorded at Woodcray Studios in Berkshire and was released in 1988. It is the first album to feature Ricky McGuire (ex UK Subs) on bass guitar. The album again features songs written about British culture and history. The only single on the album to feature a promotional video was The Colours. The video was given a Les Miserables style theme due to its historical lyrical content and features writer Paul Simmonds in drag playing the part of a woman of ill repute. The song itself, however was banned by the BBC due to the line, "You've come here to watch me hang!", which echoed the events happening in South African townships at the time, in particular the plight of the Sharpeville Six. The song told the story of the 1797 Nore mutiny and the execution of Richard Parker for his role in the mutiny. Despite the ban it still managed to reach number 61 in the UK singles chart. The Crest is the only single to have an extended remixed version. This was less successful only reaching number 94 in the UK singles chart. Initial vinyl LP copies were a limited edition which came with a song book of lyrics and guitar tabs as well as a poster.

== Personnel ==
The Men They Couldn't Hang

- Stefan Cush (a.k.a. Cush) – vocals, guitar, horn
- Ricky McGuire - bass guitar
- Jon Odgers – drums, percussion
- Philip Odgers (a.k.a. Swill) – vocals, guitar, recorder
- Paul Simmonds - guitar, bouzuki, mandolin, lute

Additional musicians

- Lindsey Lowe and Graham Ashton – trumpet
- Bobby Valentino – violin
- Stephen Shaw - pipe
- Stephen Wick - tuba

Producer and engineer

- Mick Glossop

== Track listing ==
Original Side 1
No.	Title	Writer(s)	Lead vocals	Length
1.	"The Crest"	Paul Simmonds	Cush, Swill	4:05
2.	"Smugglers"	Traditional	Swill, Cush	4:28
3.	"Dover Lights"	Paul Simmonds	Cush, Swill	3:40
4.	"Bounty Hunter"	Paul Simmonds	Cush	3:36
5.	"Island in the Rain"	Paul Simmonds	Swill, Cush	4:26

Original Side 2
No.	Title	Writer(s)	Lead vocals	Length
6.	"The Colours"	Paul Simmonds	Cush, Swill	3:51
7.	"Midnight Train"	Paul Simmonds	Cush, Swill	3:08
8.	"Father's Wrong"	Philip Odgers	Swill	4:32
9.	"Life of a Small Fry"	Stefan Cush	Cush	3:39
10.	"Mary's Present"	Philip Odgers	Swill	3:02

Additional Tracks on cassette and CD version
No.	Title	Writer(s)	Lead vocals	Length
11.	"Silver Dagger"	Traditional	Cush, Swill	3:40
12.	"Restless Highway"	Paul Simmonds	Swill, Cush	3:28
13.	"Country Song"	Philip Odgers	Cush, Swill	3:46
14.	"The Crest (extended re-mix)"	Paul Simmonds	Cush, Swill	12:01
