= Silver Town (album) =

Studio album by The Men They Couldn't Hang
- Released: 1989
- Recorded: January–February 1989
- Studio: Woodcray Manor Studios, Wokingham, Berkshire
- Genre: Roots rock, Folk-rock, Folk-punk
- Length: 55:00
- Label: Silvertone
- Producer: Mick Glossop

The Men They Couldn't Hang chronology
Waiting for Bonaparte (1988)	Silver Town (1989)	The Domino Club (1990)

Singles from Silver Town
- 1. "A Place in the Sun" Released: 1989; 2. "Rain, Steam and Speed" Released: 1989; 3. "A Map of Morocco" Released: 1989

Silver Town is the fourth studio album by The Men They Couldn't Hang. It was released in 1989 under the Silvertone label and recorded at Woodcray Manor Studios in Berkshire. There were three singles released from the album, "A Place in the Sun", "Rain, Steam and Speed" and "A Map of Morocco". "Rosettes" was originally earmarked as a single but was cancelled due to the Hillsborough disaster as the song's lyrical content centred on the football hooligan culture at the time.

The title of the track "Rain, Steam and Speed" was taken from the painting Rain, Steam and Speed – The Great Western Railway by J.M.W. Turner, which is in the National Gallery in London. It was the only single released from the album which had a promotional video. It was shot in black and white and featured the band members and some of their family members dressed in Victorian clothing. Lead singer Swill portrays engineer Isambard Kingdom Brunel who is mentioned during the song's bridge.

== Track listing ==
1. "Rosettes"
2. "A Place in the Sun"
3. "Homefires"
4. "Diamonds, Gold and Fur"
5. "Company Town"
6. "Lobotomy, Gets 'Em Home"
7. "Blackfriars Bridge"
8. "Rain, Steam and Speed"
9. "Down All the Days"
10. "Hellfire and Damnation"
11. "El Vaquero"

== Re-master release ==
The album was re-released as a re-mastered CD in 2010 with 6 bonus tracks and a booklet containing new interview with the group by Jerry Ewing with additional photos supplied by the band. The bonus tracks on the release are:

1. Rubber Bullets (B side single)
2. The Day the Clocks Went Back (B side single)
3. Rosettes (Extended Mix)
4. A Place in the Sun (Demo)
5. Rain Speed and Steam (Demo)
6. A Map of Morocco (A side single)

== Personnel ==
- Swill - vocals, acoustic guitar, penny whistle
- Stefan Cush - vocals, electric guitar, guttural sounds
- Paul Simmonds - lead guitar, 12-string guitar, electric mandolin, electric bouzouki
- Ricky McGuire - bass
- Nick Muir - piano, organ, accordion, backing vocals
- Jon Odgers - drums, percussion
- Lindsay Lowe - trumpet
- Bobby Valentino - fiddle

Technical

- Phil Smee - design
- Keith Morris - photography
