= Paul Bryers =

British cinematographer

- Born: 1 August 1955 (age 71); Liverpool, England, UK
- Occupations: film director, screenwriter, author

Paul Bryers (born 1 August 1955 in Liverpool) is a British film director, screenwriter and fiction author.

== Biography ==
Paul Bryers studied Modern history, politics and economy at the University of Southampton. Later he joined the Daily Mirror’s training scheme for journalists. He worked there for two years, and then became a reporter and presenter for the British commercial television station Southern ITV. Later he became producer and director, covering conflicts in Africa, the Middle East and South America.

=== Film, television and radio ===
After his career as a reporter, Paul Bryers became especially known for his documentaries and docudramas for the television channels BBC Two, Channel 4, Channel 5 and PBS.

He wrote the radio play, The Floating Republic, about the Nore Mutiny for BBC Radio 4 which was broadcast on Saturday 4 December 1982 and starred Brian Cox as the mutineer Richard Parker.

Bryers got quickly noticed by docudramas as A Vote For Hitler (1988) about the Munich Agreement in 1938 and the subsequent 1938 Oxford by-election, and A Strike Out of Time (1990), a docudrama about the miners’ strike in 1985.

In 2001 he made the four-part TV series Queen Victoria's Empire with Donald Sutherland, which won the Outstanding achievement award at the New York Film Festival in 2002.

Besides documentaries and docudramas Bryer adapted some classics of the world literature for television. In 1992 he made the TV film Incident in Judea, an adaptation of the biblical chapters from the novel The Master and Margarita by Mikhail Bulgakov with Mark Rylance in the role of Yeshua (Jesus) and John Woodvine in the role of Pontius Pilate, and in 1992 he made a screen version of the theater play The Golden Years by Arthur Miller about the conquest of Mexico by Hernán Cortés, with Robert Powell as the conquistador Cortés and Ronald Pickup as Montezuma.

=== The author Paul Bryers ===
Paul Bryers is also the author of several novels, published between 1976 and 2003. He got the British Arts Council Award for Best First Novel.

In 2008 he started writing The Mysteries of the Septagram, a series of novels for children and teenagers. The first in the series, Kobal, was published in 2008 and was nominated for the Waterstone's Book of the Year Award. Thereafter followed Avatar (2009) and Abyss (2010). His next novel for children and young adults is to be published by Hachette Children's Books in August 2013. Called 'Spooked:The Haunting of Kit Connelly' it tells the story of a girl whose meeting with her own ghost changes her life.

=== The author Seth Hunter ===
In 2008 Paul Bryers started another series of books under the pseudonym Seth Hunter. The stories play in the time of the War of the First Coalition, an armed conflict between the revolutionary France and an alliance of European powers, later known as the First Coalition. The hero of these novels is called Nathan Peake.

== Filmography ==
- 1988 – A Vote for Hitler (TV film, Channel 4)
- 1989 – The Survivor's Guide (Documentary TV series, Channel 4)
- 1990 – A Strike Out of Time (TV film, Channel 4)
- 1991 – Incident in Judaea (TV film, Channel 4)
- 1992 – The Golden Years (TV film, Channel 4)
- 1993 - The Essential History of Germany (Documentary, BBC Two)
- 2001 – Tales from the Tower (Docudrama, The Learning Channel)
- 2001 – Queen Victoria's Empire (Documentary TV series, PBS)
- 2002 – Harem (Docudrama series, Channel 4)
- 2003 – Seven Wonders of the Industrial World – The Line (TV series, BBC Two)
- 2004 – The Great Nazi Cash Swindle (Documentary, Channel 4)
- 2005 – Murder at Canterbury (Docudrama, BBC Two)
- 2005 – Flood at Winchester (Docudrama, BBC Two)
- 2005 – Nelson's Trafalgar (Docudrama, Channel 4)

== Bibliography ==
=== Novels ===
- 1978 – Hollow Target
- 1978 – Cat Trapper
- 1982 – Hire Me a Base Fellow
- 1987 – Coming First
- 1991 – The Adultery Department
- 1995 – In a Pig's Ear
- 1998 – The Prayer of the Bone
- 2003 – The Used Women's Book Club
- 2023 - The Vatican Candidate

=== The Mysteries of the Septagram ===
- 2008 – Kobal
- 2009 – Avatar
- 2010 – Abyss

=== Seth Hunter ===
- 2008 – The Time of Terror
- 2009 – The Tide of War
- 2010 – The Price of Glory
- 2011 – The Winds of Folly
- 2012 - The Flag of Freedom
- 2013 - The Spoils of Conquest
- 2021 - The Sea of Silence
- 2022 - Trafalgar: The Fog of War
- 2024 - The Force of Fate
