= The Nips =

English punk rock band

- Also known as: The Nipple Erectors (until 1978)
- Origin: London, England
- Genres: Punk rock, psychobilly, garage rock
- Years active: 1976–1981, 2008-2009
- Labels: Soho, Chiswick, Big Beat (currently no label)
- Past members: Shanne Bradley; Shane MacGowan; Gavin "Fritz" Douglas; Eric "Le Baton" Baconstrip; Roger Towndrow; Larry Hinrichs; Gavin "Fritz" Douglas; James Fearnley; Adrian "Arcane Vendetta" Fox; John Hasler; Gerry Maccleduff; Rick Collett; Phil Rowland; Mark Harrison; John "Grinny" Grinton; Roger "Travis" Williams; Terry Smith; Jon Moss; Eric "Le Baton" Baconstrip

The Nips are an English punk rock band formed in London in 1976 as the Nipple Erectors by punk artist Shanne Bradley. They were Shane MacGowan's first musical group.

== History ==
Initially consisting of vocalist/songwriter Shane MacGowan (known at the time as 'Shane O'Hooligan'), bassist/songwriter/original punk artist Shanne Bradley, guitarist/artist Roger Towndrow and drummer Adrian Fox (AKA "Arcane Vendetta"); the Nipple Erectors performed their first gig at the Roxy Club in Covent Garden in 1977. The band later released four singles and there was one bootleg live album between 1978 and 1981. Inspired by the Stooges, the Nipple Erectors incorporated elements of rockabilly and 1960s garage rock into their music.

Following the release of their first single, "King of the Bop"/"Nervous Wreck", in June 1978, on Soho Records, the band renamed themselves the Nips and released the garage punk song "All the Time in the World"/"Private Eye" with Phil Rowland of Eater (band) on drums. By May 1979, the band's line up had changed to include Gavin "Fritz" Douglas, on guitar. "Gabrielle" was released in November 1979, first on Soho Records, and then reissued on Chiswick Records with John ("Grinny") Grinton (ex Skrewdriver) on drums. By the time of its release, Grinny had been replaced by Roger Travis Williams. Gavin Douglas' guitar playing on this record marked a change in the band's sound to a more melodic style.

A live album, Only the End of the Beginning was released on Soho Records in 1980, from a recording made whilst on tour with the Purple Hearts.

In 1980, the Nips recorded a demo for Polydor Records at their studio in Bond Street. It was produced by Paul Weller. There were four songs recorded for this session: "Happy Song", "Nobody to Love", "Ghost Town" and "Love To Make You Cry". The line up for this recording was Shane MacGowan (vocals), Shanne Bradley (bass), Gavin Douglas (guitar) and Mark Harrison (ex Bernie Tormé Band) on drums. "Happy Song"/"Nobody to Love" was released as a single in October 1981, on Test Pressing Records. The Nips announced to the press that they were quitting after a last gig on 10 March 1980 at London's Covent Garden Rock Garden. MacGowan and Bradley did reform the band later that year, albeit briefly. The line up included James Fearnley on guitar and Jon Moss (ex–the Damned) on drums. This line up played a final gig in December 1980 at London's Music Machine with the Jam. In 1981 Jon Moss joined up with Boy George to form Culture Club.

During 1981, Bradley took the band in another direction away from the traditional rock band format to incorporate Greek, Cretan and Irish Roots/Folk music. The popular Irish folk and American folk song "Poor Paddy Works on the Railway" had previously formed part of their early live set with Guitarist Roger Towndrow. This line up included Macgowan and Bradley plus John Hasler (ex Madness) on standup snare drum and Scots/Irish Folk Fiddler David Rattray. Later that year Bradley decided to take a break from music. Shane MacGowan and John Hasler went on to play in Pogue Mahone, later shortened to the Pogues. In 1984, Shanne Bradley co-founded the Men They Couldn't Hang to play "The Alternative Country and Western Festival" in March 1984 at the Electric Ballroom in Camden.

In 1987, Big Beat released an anthology LP named Bops, Babes, Booze and Bovver, credited to "Nips n Nipple Erectors". It collects both sides of the first three singles issued on Soho, as well as adding two outtakes: "So Pissed Off" and "Stavordale Rd, N5". The later CD edition added another two outtakes: "Venus in Bovver Boots" and "Fuss & Bother".

=== Reformation ===
On 6 May 2008, the Nipple Erectors reformed, playing a somewhat secret gig at the 100 Club, Oxford Street, London. The line-up consisted of Shanne Bradley, Shane MacGowan, Eric "Le Baton" Baconstrip, and Fritz Douglas. Bradley's daughter Eucalypta sang backing vocals on the final number "Gabrielle". The group also performed one month later although this time minus MacGowan who was replaced by Eucalypta on vocals since Shane was in Ireland. In 2009 Shanne Bradley and Gavin Douglas travelled to Ireland. On 16 August 2009 a rehearsal with a drummer Mick Cronin was arranged at Philly Ryans Bar, Nenagh, Tipperary, Ireland.

== Discography ==
=== Singles ===
- "King of the Bop" (b/w "Nervous Wreck") (as Nipple Erectors, 1978), Soho Records
- "All the Time in the World" (b/w "Private Eye") (1979), Soho Records
- "Gabrielle" (b/w "Vengeance") (1980), Soho Records
- "Happy Song" (b/w "Nobody to Love") (1981), Test Pressings Records

=== Albums ===
- Only the End of the Beginning (1980), Soho Records [recorded live March 1980 at Wolverhampton Polytechnic on the Purple Hearts tour]
- Bops, Babes, Booze and Bovver (1987), Big Beat Records [Anthology of all Soho singles & b-sides with bonus unreleased tracks]

== Bibliography ==
- Pogue Mahone: Kiss My Arse: The Story of The Pogues by Carol Clerk, Omnibus Press, 2006, ISBN 978-1846090080
