= Shanne Bradley =

British punk musician, songwriter, and artist

Shanne Bradley (born 1957) is an English musician, songwriter, and artist. She founded a punk band, The Nipple Erectors (The Nips), in 1976 playing bass guitar with Shane MacGowan on vocals, and co-founded The Men They Couldn't Hang in 1984. Bradley was also known as Shanne Skratch and briefly as Shanne Hasler.

== Bands ==
- The Launderettes (1976) with Ray Pist and Chaotic Bass
- The Nipple Erectors/ The Nips (1976–1981, reformed in 2008) with Shane Macgowan. First performance in 1977 at The Roxy, London
- The Men They Couldn't Hang 1984–1987

== Association with the Sex Pistols ==
Bradley was an early associate of the Sex Pistols. The song "Satellite" (released as the B-side of the "Holidays in the Sun" single) was written about Bradley.

== Discography ==
=== Singles ===
- (1978) "King of the Bop" - The Nipple Erectors also included on the NME compilation album Pogo A Go Go!
- (1978) "All the Time in the World" - The Nips
- (1979) "Gabrielle" - The Nips
- (1981) "Happy Song" - The Nips
- (1984) "The Green Fields Of France"- The Men They Couldn't Hang - 7" Demon Records IMP-003
- (1984) "The Green Fields Of France", "The Men They Couldn't Hang ", "Hush Little Baby" - The Men They Couldn't Hang - 12" Demon/IMP-003T
- (1985) "Ironmasters", "Rawhide" - The Men They Couldn't Hang - 7" Demon/IMP-005
- (1985) "Ironmasters", "Donald Where's Your Troosers", "Rawhide" - The Men They Couldn't Hang - 12" Demon/IMP-005T
- (1985) "Greenback Dollar", "Night To Remember" - The Men They Couldn't Hang - 7" Demon D-1040
- (1985) "Greenback Dollar", "The Bells", "Night To Remember", "Hell Or England" - The Men They Couldn't Hang - 12" Demon D-1040T12
- (1986) "Gold Rush" "The Ghosts Of Cable Street" - The Men They Couldn't Hang - 7" MCA-SELL-1
- (1986) "Gold Rush" "The Ghosts Of Cable Street" "Walkin' Talkin" - The Men They Couldn't Hang - 12" MCA-SELL-T1
- (1986) "Shirt Of Blue" "Johnny Come Home (live)" " A Night To Remember (live)" - The Men They Couldn't Hang - 7" MCA-SELL-2
- (1986) "Shirt Of Blue" "Johnny Come Home (live)" "A Night To Remember (live)" "Whiskey With Me Giro (live)" "Scarlet Ribbons (live)" - The Men They Couldn't Hang - 12" MCA-SELL-T2
- (1986) "Ghosts Of Cable Street" "Dream Machine" The Men They Couldn't Hang - 7" MCA-SELL-3
- (1986) "Ghosts Of Cable Street" "Dream Machine" "Liverpool Lullaby" - The Men They Couldn't Hang - 12" MCA-SELL-T3

=== Albums ===
- (1987) Bops, Babes, Booze and Bovver - The Nipple Erectors posthumous singles compilation
- (1980) Only the End of the Beginning - The Nipple Erectors live at Wolverhampton Poly. Purple Hearts tour
- (1984) Don't Let The Hope Close Down - Various - Hope Springs Records- HOPE 1 B4 - included The Men They Couldn't Hang - "Whiskey In Me Giro"
- (1985) Night of a Thousand Candles - The Men They Couldn't Hang LP Demon FIEND-050
- (1987) Night of a Thousand Candles - The Men They Couldn't Hang CD Demon FIENDCD-050
- (1986) How Green Is The Valley - The Men They Couldn't Hang - LP MCA 254 584-1 (MCF-3337)
- (1986) How Green Is The Valley - The Men They Couldn't Hang - CD MCA MCLD-19075
- (1998) Majestic Grill: The Best Of The Men They Couldn't Hang - CD compilation Demon Records FIENDCD 940
- (2007) Demos and Rarities Volume 1 - The Men They Couldn't Hang - Vinyl Star
- (2009) Quiet Please - The New Best Of Nick Lowe - Nick Lowe - Double CD, Compilation DVD, Yep Roc Records - YEP 2622; Country US CD1-25 - included "Wishing Well"

== Sources ==
- Kiss My Arse - The Story Of The Pogues by Carol Clerk - Omnibus Press
