= The Men They Couldn't Hang =

British folk punk group

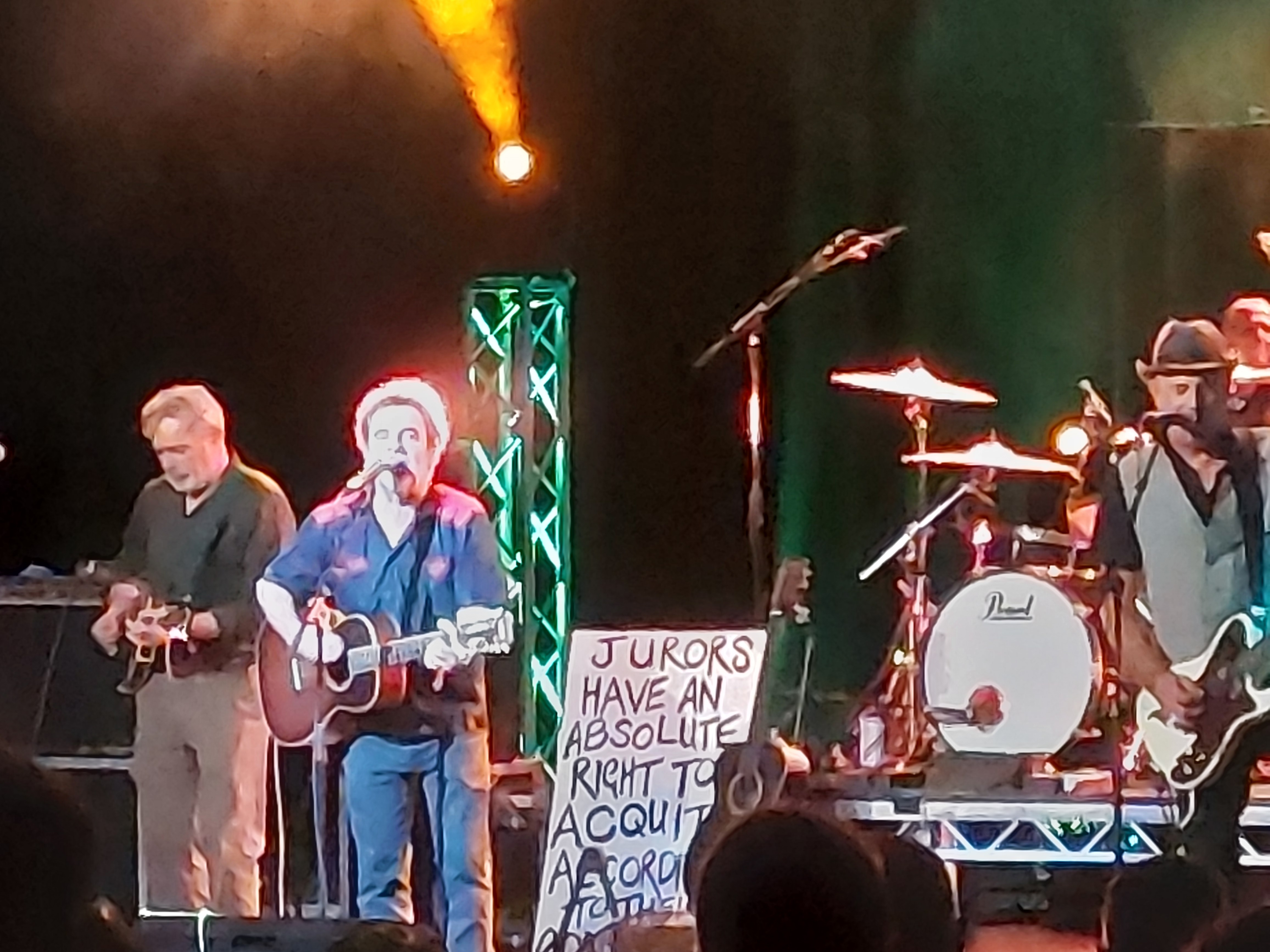
- Playing at Rebellion Festival 2024.

Background information
- Origin: London / Southampton / Portsmouth, England
- Genres: Roots rock, folk rock, folk punk
- Years active: 1984–1991, 1996–present
- Labels: Demon, Diablo, Magnet, MCA, Silvertone, WEA, Jive, Fun After All, Twah!, Recall, Vinyl Star
- Members: Phil Odgers; Paul Simmonds; Ricky McGuire; Tom Spencer; Billy Abbott; Bobby Valentino
- Past members: Stefan Cush; Shanne Bradley; Sputnik Weazel; Nick Muir; Kenny Harris; Jon Odgers; Simon Hanson
- Website: tmtch.co.uk

The Men They Couldn't Hang (TMTCH) are a British folk punk group. The original group consisted of Stefan Cush (vocals, guitar), Paul Simmonds (guitar, bouzouki, mandolin, keyboards), Philip "Swill" Odgers (vocals, guitar, tin whistle, melodica), Jon Odgers (drums, percussion) and Shanne Bradley (bass guitar).

== 1984–1991: Formation, controversy and success ==
The Men They Couldn't Hang came together in 1984 to perform at the alternative music festival in Camden Town alongside The Pogues and the Boothill Foot Tappers. Paul Simmonds, Philip 'Swill' Odgers and his brother Jon, veterans of the Southampton-based pop-punk band Catch 22, met Pogues roadie Stefan Cush whilst busking in Shepherd's Bush in London. Their early line-up was Stefan Cush, Philip Odgers, Paul Simmonds, Jon Odgers and Shanne Bradley. The band's name is inspired by "The Man They Couldn't Hang", and was originally coined by Shane MacGowan - with whom Bradley previously played in The Nipple Erectors - as a potential name for his own band, who eventually became The Pogues.

Their first single, a cover version of "The Green Fields of France", was released in 1984. Written by Eric Bogle (of "And The Band Played Waltzing Matilda" fame), the song's protagonist imagined having a conversation with one of the fallen soldiers of World War I whilst sitting by his graveside. It received airplay on the John Peel show on BBC Radio 1, and finished at Number 3 in Peel's Festive 50 for that year. It became a No.1 hit in the UK Indie Chart.

The following year they were signed to the Demon label, which released their début album, Night of a Thousand Candles, and its accompanying single "Ironmasters", a self-penned number by main songwriter Simmonds, linking the Industrial Revolution to the present-day treatment of the working class. The original final line of the song, "and oh, that iron bastard, she still gets her way" (a reference to the then Prime Minister Margaret Thatcher), had to be removed for the recorded version to ensure radio airplay. They were again named in Peel's yearly Festive 50, this time at Number 11. They followed this up with a new single not taken from the album, "Greenback Dollar", a cover of the song written by Hoyt Axton and recorded by The Kingston Trio. The single was produced by Nick Lowe.

In 1985, the band signed for MCA Records and released How Green Is The Valley. The record included "Ghosts of Cable Street", a political song concerning the Battle of Cable Street in 1936 and "Shirt of Blue", which referenced the miners' strike of 1984–85. At the end of promotion for the album, Shanne Bradley left to create music with Wreckless Eric and The Chicken Family; she was replaced on bass by Ricky McGuire (ex UK Subs).

In 1987 the band switched to Magnet Records and the new record released was Waiting for Bonaparte. "The Colours" told of an English mutineer sailor during the Napoleonic War and "The Crest" a stretcher bearer during World War II. Whilst "The Colours" was at Number 61 in the UK Singles Chart it was blacklisted by BBC Radio 1 because of the line "You've come here to watch me hang", which echoed the events happening in South African townships at the time, in particular the plight of the Sharpeville Six.

In 1988, the band were on the move again and signed for new label Silvertone. The band was joined by Nick Muir (ex Fire Next Time) at this time on piano, organ and accordion, who remained with the band during their time at Silvertone. Muir later found success as an electronic music producer and half of the duo Bedrock.

The band recorded two albums for Silvertone, the first being Silver Town. Highlights of Silver Town included "Rain, Steam and Speed", "A Place in the Sun" and "Rosettes". Silver Town was the only TMTCH album to reach the Top 40 of the UK Albums Chart, peaking at No. 39. They followed this up in 1990 with The Domino Club, which had a more conventional rock sound dispensing with much of the folk element. In August 1990, the band supported David Bowie in his concerts at the Milton Keynes Bowl, as part of his Sound+Vision Tour.

The band split in 1991 after releasing the live album Alive, Alive-O, a performance recorded at London's Town & Country Club that was later released as a DVD, The Shooting, by Cherry Red Records. Paul Simmonds and "Swill" Odgers then formed Liberty Cage who released an album, Sleep of the Just, in 1994 and an EP, I'll Keep It With Mine, in 1995.

== 1996–present: Reformation ==
The band reformed in 1996, but minus drummer Jon Odgers who had become Therapy?'s drum technician. He was replaced by Kenny Harris of The Screaming Blue Messiahs. Their new album was Never Born To Follow, released on the Demon label in 1996. The following year the band released the mini-album Big Six Pack. Two "Best Of" collections followed, Majestic Grill and The Mud, The Blood and the Beer, both in 1998.

The band again withdrew into semi-retirement, during which time Odgers and Simmonds again released new material together (this time under their own names), Baby Fishlips (originally released under the pseudonym Preacher Jethro Brimstone and the Watermelon Kid) in 1999 and Folk at the Fortress in 2002.

The band released a brand new CD in 2003, The Cherry Red Jukebox. In 2005 the band released two DVDs, Shooting, and 21 Years of Love And Hate (released on Secret Records) to celebrate 21 years together. The latter was later released as a live double CD Smugglers and Bounty Hunters.

During further breaks from the band, Phil "Swill" Odgers released two CDs with his band The Swaggerband, which includes Ricky McGuire and Jon Odgers, plus lyrical contributions from Paul Simmonds: The Day After in 2004 and Elvis Lives Here on Irregular Records in 2006.

The group continue to play occasional live concerts. Their next planned release is an acoustic folk-orientated CD, including the reworking of several popular old songs from their back catalogue. In October 2006 the band announced on their website titles of five new tracks they are demoing for their new album: "Brixton Hill", "Jam Tomorrow", "Madelaine", "Man in the Subway" and "The Winter Wind". In January 2007 more song titles were announced: "Cocaine Housewife", "Love Tomorrow", "Pair of Shoes", "Lead Me to the Gallows", "Whisky & Wine", "Snow Is Falling" and "Call Me Darling". Although these were originally identified primarily as songs that would appear on the next TMTCH album this was not to be the case. All except "Jam Tomorrow" and "Man in the Subway" subsequently appeared on Paul Simmonds' solo country album titled The Rising Road, released in June 2008.

In January 2007, Paul Simmonds' book A Bag of Songs was published. It featured a personal selection of 50 songs with lyrics, chords and commentary. In March 2007, the band released a new CD through their website Demos & Rarities Volume 1. This album is a collection of rare unreleased TMTCH recordings from the Silver Town and The Domino Club albums. The band are joined by Tom Spencer (The Yo Yo's, Fastlane Roogalator, The Loyalties) bringing banjo to the line-up and additional guitar and backing vocals. They released a new album, Devil on the Wind, on Robb Johnson's label Irregular Records on 1 June 2009. As a prelude to the album the band released a six track EP CD Devil on the Wind EP via their website. The EP contains an alternative mixes of "Devil on the Wind" and "Aquamarine", plus four songs not available on the full album.

On 8 October 2009, almost 25 years since The Men They Couldn't Hang played their first proper gig in Camden Town at The Electric Ballroom, they returned for the official 25 Year Anniversary Celebration.

2012 saw the release of an album from Stefan Cush's new band the Feral Family, and Paul Simmonds was recording and touring with roots singer Naomi Bedford as well as numerous live dates for TMTCH. The latter including appearances at Mike Peter's "The Gathering", and festival appearances alongside Billy Bragg and Adam Ant. They headlined the 10th anniversary commemoration of Joe Strummer's Acton Town Hall show which also featured a special guest appearance by Hard Fi.

March 2013 saw the release of Phil (Swill) Odgers' solo album, The Godforsaken Voyage, produced by Mick Glossop. On the day of release of The Godforsaken Voyage, The Men They Couldn't Hang joined Stiff Little Fingers for three weeks on their UK tour. This combined with several festival appearances in UK and Germany acted as a prelude to TMTCH's 30th anniversary in 2014.

2014 marked the band's 30th anniversary, and they released their ninth album, The Defiant.

In 2019, the band won Best Live Band in Folking.com's annual awards, voted for by 10,000 registered subscribers to the folk website.

Co-lead singer Stefan Cush died on 5 February 2021, after suffering a heart attack.

== Musical references ==
Canadian rock band The Tragically Hip make apparent reference to the band in the song "Bobcaygeon".

Shane MacGowan of the Pogues named an instrumental "Shanne Bradley", after the original bassist of The Men They Couldn't Hang and member of his previous band The Nipple Erectors. The track appeared on the 12" of "Fairytale of New York" and remastered versions of If I Should Fall from Grace with God CDs.
