= Spring Festival at Spaso House =

1935 diplomatic event in Moscow

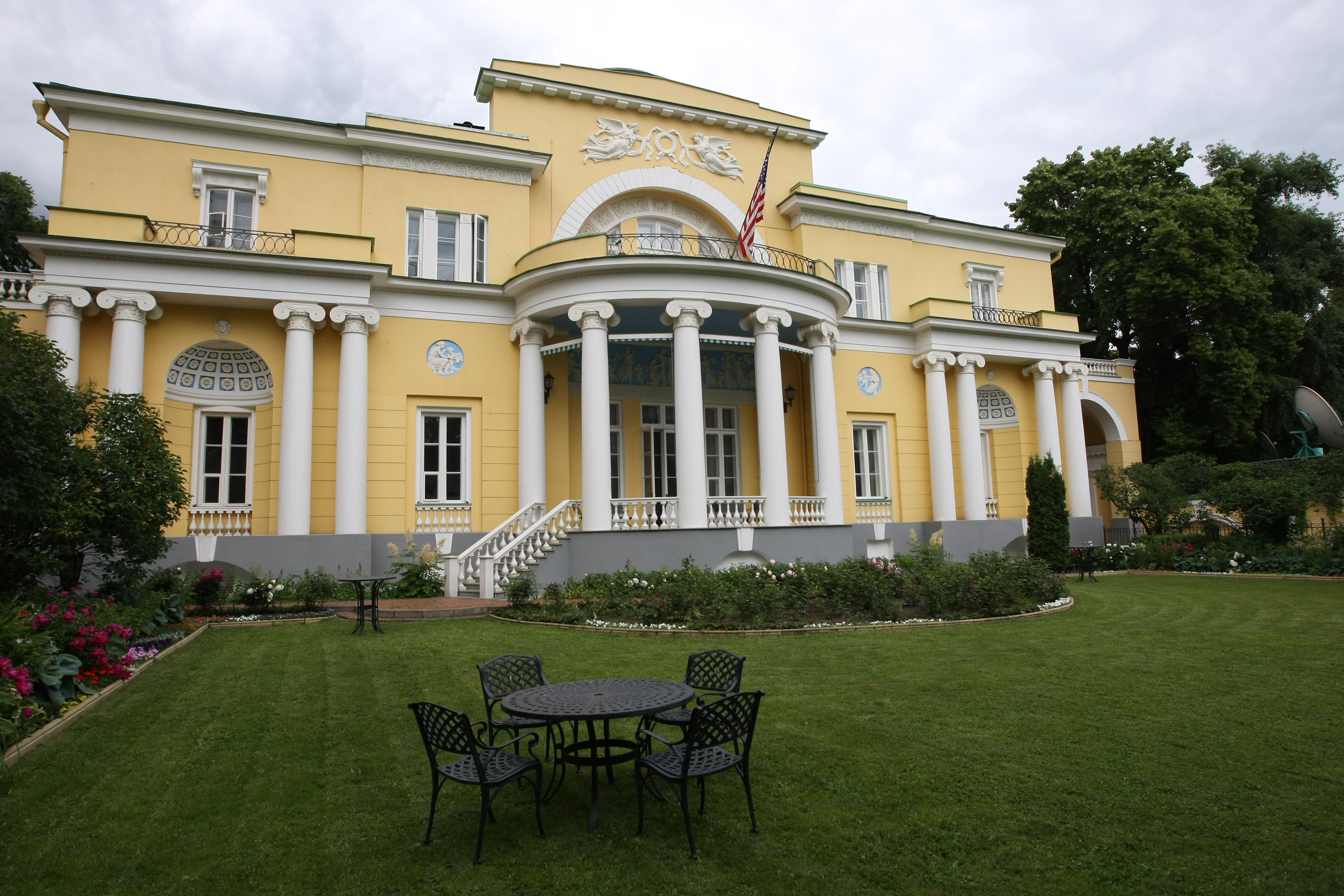
Spaso House, the residence of the U.S. Ambassador in Moscow

The Spring Festival at Spaso House was an event held on the night of April 23 to April 24, 1935, at Spaso House, the residence of the U.S. Ambassador in Moscow. Approximately 500 guests and members of the American diplomatic corps attended the event. According to the embassy secretary, these included "everyone who mattered in Moscow, except Stalin". Alexander Etkind highlighted three groups of attendees: Bolshevik intellectuals, senior military commanders, and the theatrical elite. The event was organized by the first U.S. Ambassador to the Soviet Union, who served as a special assistant to the U.S. Secretary of State from 1933 to 1936, William Christian Bullitt Jr.. The arrangements for decorating Spaso House and organizing the festival program were handled by embassy staff member Charles Thayer and the wife of one of the diplomats, Irena Wiley.

On October 29, 2010, U.S. Ambassador to Russia John Beyrle hosted a reception to commemorate the 75th anniversary of the ball at Spaso House that inspired Mikhail Bulgakov. In 2024, an exchange of remarks regarding the Spring Festival took place between the official representative of the Russian Ministry of Foreign Affairs, Maria Zakharova, and the U.S. Ambassador to Russia, Lynne Tracy. The topic of the Spring Festival has been frequently covered by Russian mass media, sometimes including details absent from the memoirs, letters, and diaries of its organizers and guests.

== Preparation ==
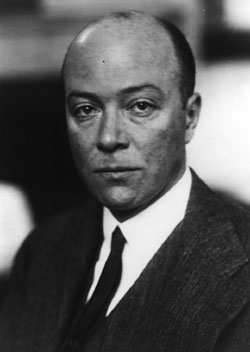
William Christian Bullitt

There are two reported dates for the festive reception held at the residence of the U.S. Ambassador in 1935. Specifically, the official website of the U.S. Embassy in Moscow dates the event to the night of April 23–24, 1935. However, in the works of Doctor of Philology and candidate of historical sciences Boris Vadimovich Sokolov, for instance, it is stated that the reception at Spaso House took place on the night of April 22–23. Spaso House is the name of the U.S. Ambassador's residence in Moscow. The event was officially called the "Spring Festival." Approximately 500 guests and members of the American diplomatic corps attended. (Note: Some sources claim that the 500 figure refers only to invited guests.) According to the embassy secretary, the attendees included "everyone who mattered in Moscow, except Stalin". Doctor of Philosophy in Slavic philology and candidate of psychological sciences Alexander Etkind identified three groups among the festival's guests: Bolshevik intellectuals, senior military commanders, and the theatrical elite. The event was organized by the first U.S. Ambassador to the Soviet Union, who also served as a special assistant to the U.S. Secretary of State from 1933 to 1936, William Christian Bullitt Jr.. Initially, his appointment as ambassador was well-received by Soviet party and state leadership. However, starting in early 1934, Bullitt's relations with Soviet authorities deteriorated, as evidenced by his published reports to Washington. In correspondence with the U.S. State Department and President Franklin D. Roosevelt, Bullitt referred to Stalin as a "Caucasian bandit" and described the Soviet Union as the embodiment of evil.

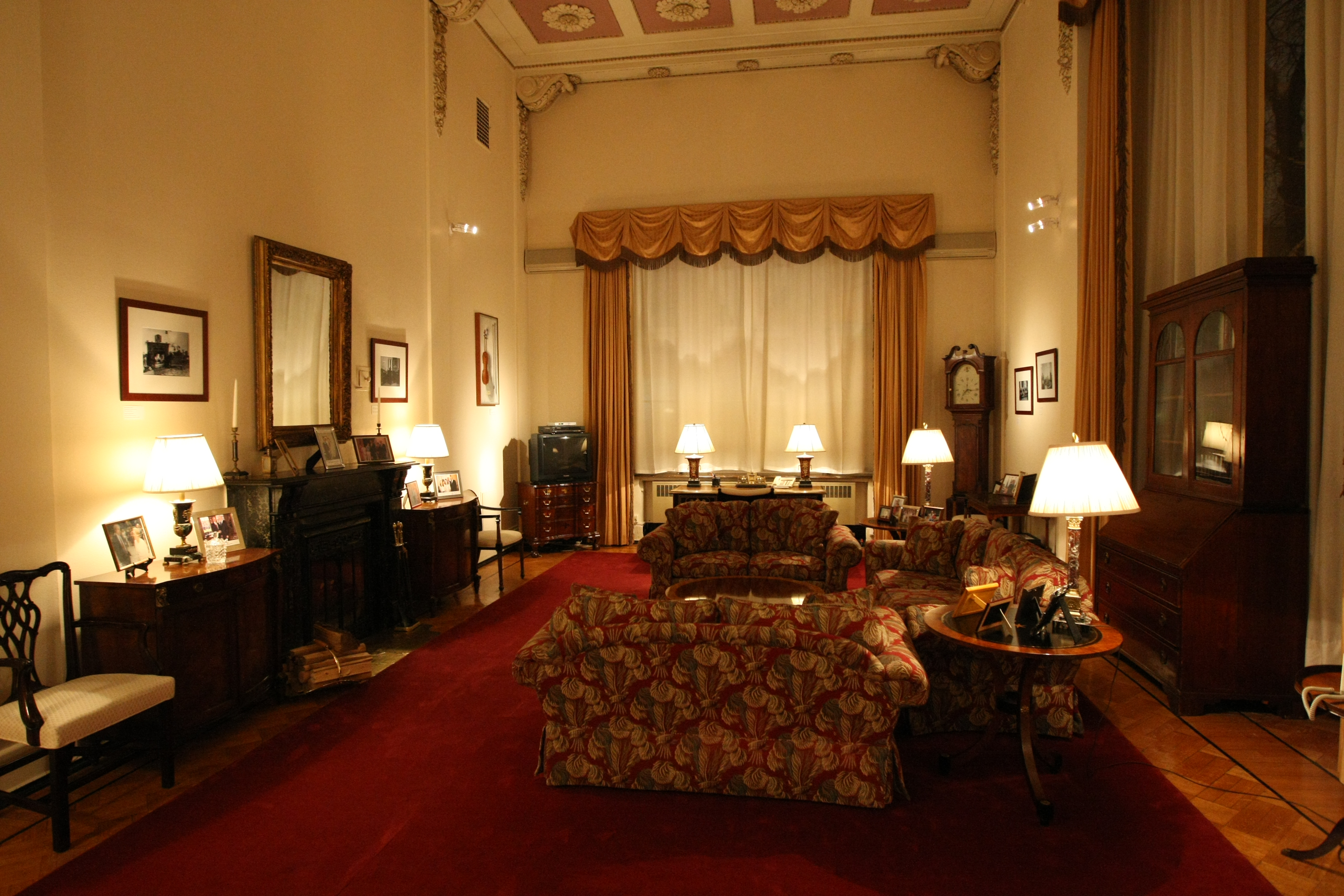
Spaso House Library, 2010

External images
- Irena Wiley on the cover of her book
- Charles William Thayer
- Charles William Thayer. Bears in the Caviar. Cover of the book's reissue

The secretary of the U.S. Embassy, Charles W. Thayer, wrote in his memoir Bears in the Caviar that the vibrant social life of foreign diplomats in Moscow during the 1930s began in early autumn and continued until late spring. In summer, social life slowed and was limited to individual receptions. American diplomats had long remained on the sidelines but became actively involved after Bullitt's arrival in Moscow. He attended several receptions, concerts, and balls at various diplomatic missions, but they did not leave a strong impression on him.

The wife of American diplomat John Cooper Wiley, Irena Wiley noted in her memoirs that tensions in the USSR sharply escalated in 1935 following the assassination of Sergei Kirov, head of the Leningrad party organization, member of the Politburo, Orgburo, and Secretary of the Central Committee of the All-Union Communist Party (Bolsheviks), on December 1, 1934. Before this, embassy staff had "frequently and freely" interacted with Soviet citizens, according to her. Now, contacts were restricted and tightly controlled. Irena Wiley described this shift as an "iron curtain" imposed by Stalin. Amid cooling relations between the two countries and the repressions described by Wiley, which affected Soviet politicians and diplomats she knew personally, she characterized the Spring Festival as follows: "It was one of the rarest occasions, more rare and precious than the whooping crane, when ideological differences and Communist hatred dissolved in an atmosphere of joy and friendship". Wiley's assessment of Soviet citizens' sentiments aligns with a fragment of a letter from William Bullitt to the U.S. President, sent on May 1, 1935: "Emotionally, Moscow is far from a pleasant place. The terror, always present, has reached such a degree that both the least and the most prominent Muscovites live in fear. Almost no one dares to interact with foreigners, and this is not an unfounded fear but a correct perception of reality".

Doctor of Philosophy in history Michael Casella-Blackburn attempted to contextualize the Spring Festival within the daily life of Moscow at the time, using Bullitt's letters from spring 1935. The ambassador noted a dual atmosphere in the capital. Emotional tension was undeniable, dominating the country. At the same time, recently introduced polo and baseball matches between Red Army soldiers and American diplomats continued. Bullitt wrote: "The Soviet Union is developing faster than ever before… the economic situation is improving, and people are increasingly adapting to communism"; "Moscow has become a more pleasant place than it was at this time last year. The metro has been built. Blocks of old buildings have been transformed into streets and squares, and street paving has improved." From the perspective of the American researcher, the Spring Festival was an attempt by the ambassador to enliven the capital's nightlife. In a record of oral memoirs by Elena Bulgakova, transcribed by literary scholar Vera Chebotaryova, the writer's wife claimed that William Bullitt annually held a reception for an American national holiday [unspecified] and that the April 23 event was one such reception.

According to instructions William Christian Bullitt left for embassy staff when departing for Washington for political consultations in the winter of 1934–1935, the upcoming event was to "surpass anything Moscow had seen before or after the Revolution." According to Charles Thayer, Bullitt expressed his expectations with the phrase: "The sky is the limit" (Irena Wiley claimed this phrase appeared in a telegram Bullitt sent to embassy staff from Washington, not in a personal conversation). In the published Russian translation, it means: "I'm not limiting you in any way," though literally: "The sky is the limit". The ball was timed to coincide with Bullitt's return to Moscow and was to take place three days after his arriva.l The event's preparation was overseen by embassy secretary Charles Thayer and Irena Wiley. It was Wiley who proposed the name "Spring Festival". Bullitt personally funded the event's expenses.

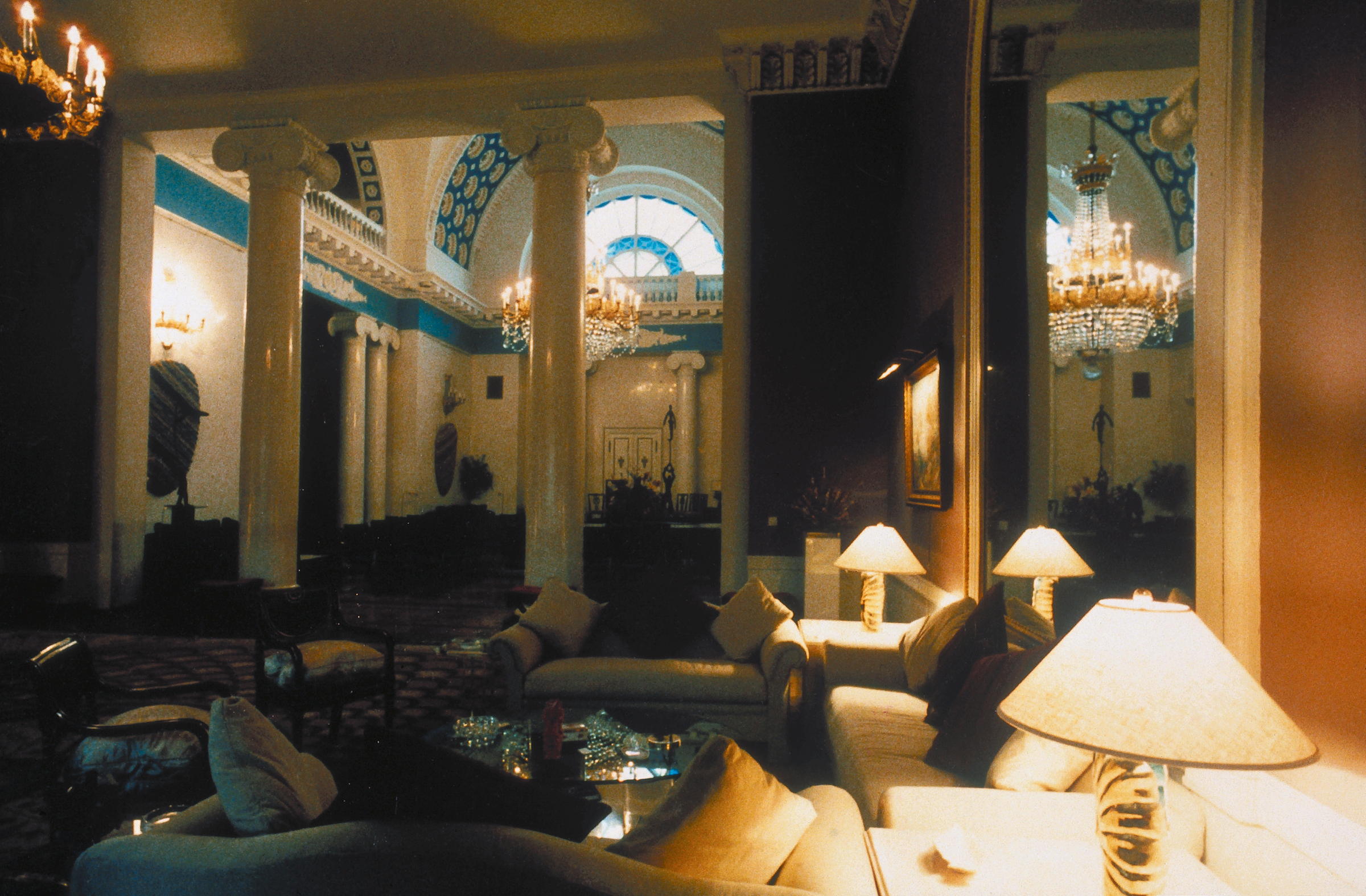
One of Spaso House's interiors, 1986

Irena Wiley later wrote that she had dreamed of choreographing and staging a ballet, but organizing a party seemed far more exciting. She admitted that her student experience of organizing parties on a minimal budget helped her address the challenges of preparation. Wiley described the festival's organizer, Charles Thayer, as a young man with boundless imagination and "Napoleonic disdain" for the word "impossible." At a meeting of those involved in the festival's preparation, it was decided to use green (tree leaves and grass), white (lambs and roosters), and gold (used to paint the animals' horns and hooves, as well as the structural elements of bird cages) as the color scheme.

Irena Wiley noted that preparing such an event in Europe or America would have posed no issues, but in Moscow, they faced significant challenges: there was "nothing in the shops, nothing in the market". The only issue quickly resolved, according to her, was the delivery of thousands of bulbs of tulips from Holland. Thayer wrote that tulips for the ball were initially sought within the Soviet Union but were ultimately purchased in Finland. However, they were already cut, posing the challenge of preserving them until the event. This was resolved using a cool pantry. Thayer noted the unusual cold in the USSR in April 1935 — ten days before the ball, there were still no buds on trees or blooming flowers in the Moscow Region. According to Thayer, a specially chartered plane was sent to Crimea to procure any flowers it could find. The flight was unsuccessful. The weather in Tbilisi was even colder than in Moscow, where the pilot went after Crimea. Wiley, however, only mentioned telegrams sent to Crimea and the Caucasus, with no reference to a specially hired pilot. She spoke not of flowers but of birch trees with budding leaves. During the event, tiny electric fans were discreetly placed near the tulips, making them sway as if in the wind.

According to Thayer in Bears in the Caviar, he already had experience organizing entertainment in the capital. At a previous reception at the ambassador's residence, he had invited trainer Vladimir Durov, who performed circus acts with three seals. The seals juggled balls, climbed up and down a ladder, and even played a Christmas melody on a hand organ. When the trainer got drunk, a female seal named Lyuba entered the buffet and then the kitchen, where she began overturning coal buckets, trash cans, and kitchen furniture. Irena Wiley insisted that animals should again be a key feature of this reception. She planned to create a miniature barnyard in a corner of the ballroom. The plan included borrowing several lambs, acquiring a number of wildflowers, and placing potted birch trees. A kolkhoz agreed to lend sheep, but their smell was noticeable even in the spacious ballroom. Attempts to wash them or spray them with perfume during rehearsals were unsuccessful. Wiley attributed this issue to requesting lambs but receiving adult sheep instead. She personally washed six sheep in a bathroom and, based on that experience, decided never to repeat the process. Young goats fared somewhat better, according to Thayer, but even their presence caused discomfort in the ballroom. The director of the Moscow Zoo suggested mountain goats (Wiley simply mentioned a dozen regular goats), which he claimed had less odor. A miniature barnyard was built on a platform near the buffet table. Wiley wrote that with gilded horns and hooves, the goats, jumping and playing in a small, decorated, and fenced area, were highly decorative.

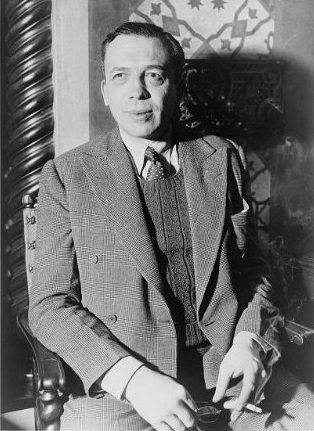
John Cooper Wiley

To evoke the arrival of spring, Wiley suggested borrowing "at least one newborn wild animal" from the zoo. They settled on a bear cub from the Moscow Zoo. At the insistence of the zoo director, a zoo employee accompanied the cub at all times. Recalling Vladimir Durov's drunken behavior, Thayer agreed but demanded a sober handler. The organizers prepared a baby bottle with a nipple for the cub and set up a platform with a tree trunk and branches for the cub to climb or rest on. The zoo director was so intrigued by the preparations that whenever an animal was born at the zoo, he called the embassy, saying, "Madame Wiley, I have something for your party!" This included a giraffe calf, a wolf cub, a llama calf, and "some other exotic animals." Irena Wiley wrote that, to her regret, she had to decline them all, as her husband, John Cooper Wiley, an embassy employee, took what she called an "unreasonable but firm stance" against including more wild animals at the party.

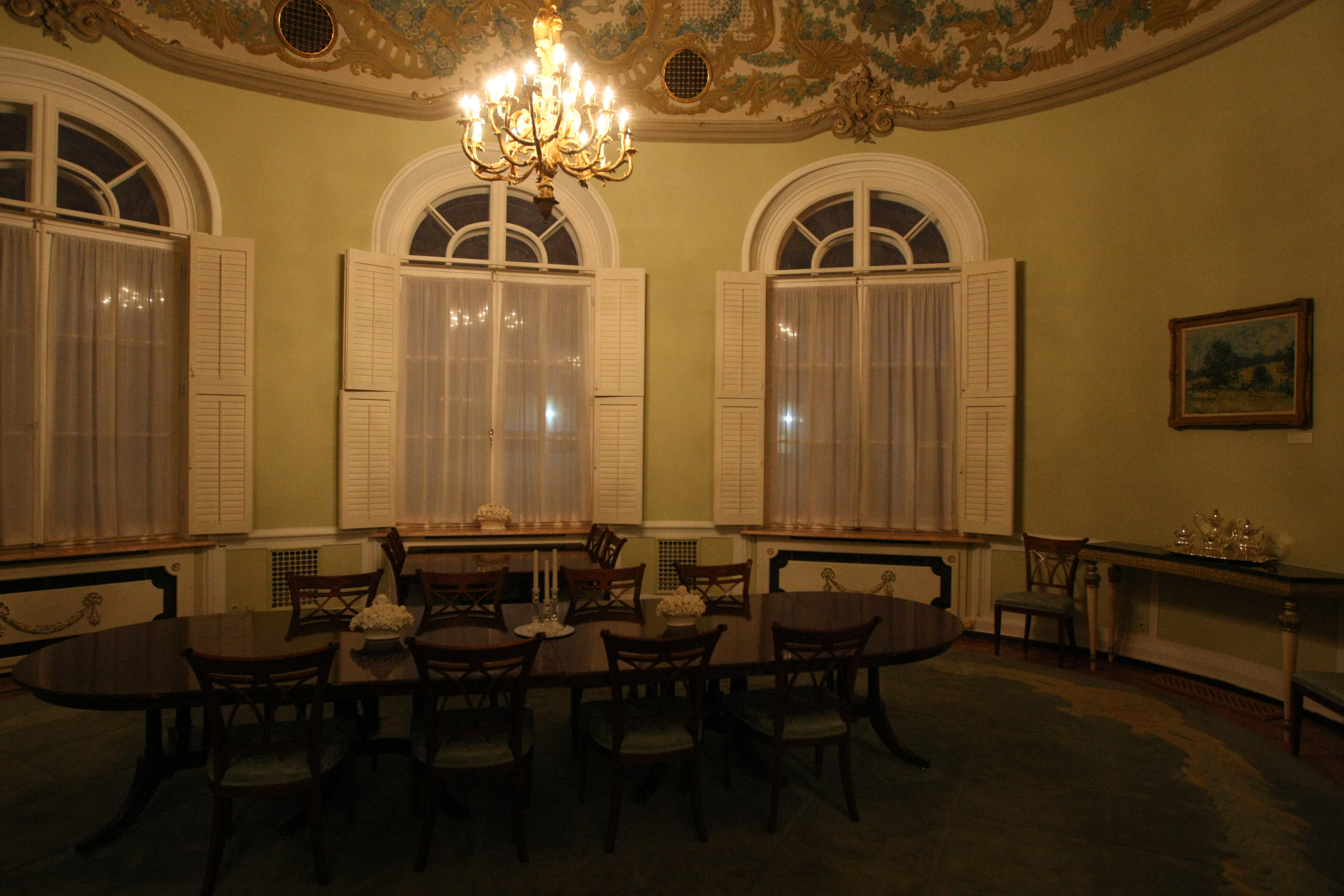
Spaso House Dining Room, 2010

Wiley also insisted on including a dozen white roosters at the ball. The birds were placed in glass cages along the walls of the dining room. The glass cages were made by a carpenter using glass inserted into towel racks taken from embassy staff rooms, which caused dissatisfaction among the staff. During the event, only one or two racks were broken, and the rest were returned to their owners. Wiley also proposed glassing the dining room floor, pumping water beneath it, and placing tropical fish and other marine creatures in an improvised aquarium under the guests' feet, allowing them to dance on it. This plan was rejected by all involved in the preparations, including Charles Thayer, who disapproved of water and fish on the ballroom floor. Decades later, Irena Wiley wrote in her memoirs: "Perhaps he was right". (Note: Thayer, in his memoirs, also mentioned a proposal to glass the dining room floor at the ambassador's residence but attributed it to a different event — a Christmas 1934 reception. He cited different reasons for its rejection: 1) glass production was not included in the First Five-Year Plan or even the Second Five-Year Plan, and 2) obtaining live fish for the aquarium would inevitably pose challenges.)

The most challenging issues were creating a birch forest in the ballroom and a green meadow on the dining room table. A special table, 10 x 1.5 yards, was built for this purpose. Trays for flowers, which had not yet been purchased, were placed every 2–3 feet along the table. Between the trays were buffet dishes intended for grass, also not yet acquired. The issue of wildflowers for the ballroom remained unresolved. A director from Kamerny Theatre, whose name Thayer did not mention in his memoir, suggested painting flowers on glass and projecting them onto the marble walls. Projectors were borrowed from the Kamerny Theatre (which canceled a performance that day), and a freelance artist was hired to paint the glass. Wild birds from the Moscow Zoo, placed in an aviary, were meant to bring the projections to life. The aviary consisted of a gilded fishing net stretched between two columns in the ballroom. After negotiations with the zoo, zebra finches were selected, but it later became clear they could slip through the net's holes.

For musical accompaniment, a jazz band from the Czechoslovakia (Elena Bulgakova claimed in her diary it was from Stockholm) touring Moscow in 1935 was hired, along with a Romani orchestra with dancers. The Romani performers were stationed in Thayer's private quarters at the ambassador's residence. In the final days before the festival, a Caucasian shashlik restaurant with a Georgian orchestra and a saber dancer was set up on the second floor of Spaso House. Garden furniture, painted green, was used for the restaurant. The paint did not dry in time, and several American diplomats stained their suits, later expressing open hostility toward Thayer.

To address the issue of birch trees, grass, and flowers, the organizers, according to Thayer, consulted specialists from the botany department of the Biology Faculty at Moscow State University. They recommended growing wild chicory on wet felt and digging up several birch trees, placing them in a warm room for a few days. The chicory was grown on a wet felt-covered floor in Spaso House's inner courtyard, and the birch trees budded in a bathroom. Both issues were resolved one or two days before the Spring Festival. Wiley described these events differently. According to her, pine and spruce trees proposed as substitutes for birches were rejected as "too sad and wintry." The situation was saved by William Bullitt's sunlamp. About a dozen young birch trees were uprooted and placed in the ambassador's bathtub near the sunlamp. On the day of the party, Wiley claimed, "the trees obediently bloomed with beautiful green leaves". Wiley credited herself with solving the grass issue, recalling how oats were grown on wet gauze in parts of Poland for Easter table decorations. She described how they "covered the embassy bathroom floor with yards and yards of wet gauze, scattered chicory seeds, and waited" for results, accompanying her account with a Buddhist aphorism: "No plant will die; every seed will grow." The seeds sprouted, and the grass for the table decoration was emerald green.

Flora and fauna at the Spaso House reception on April 24, 1935

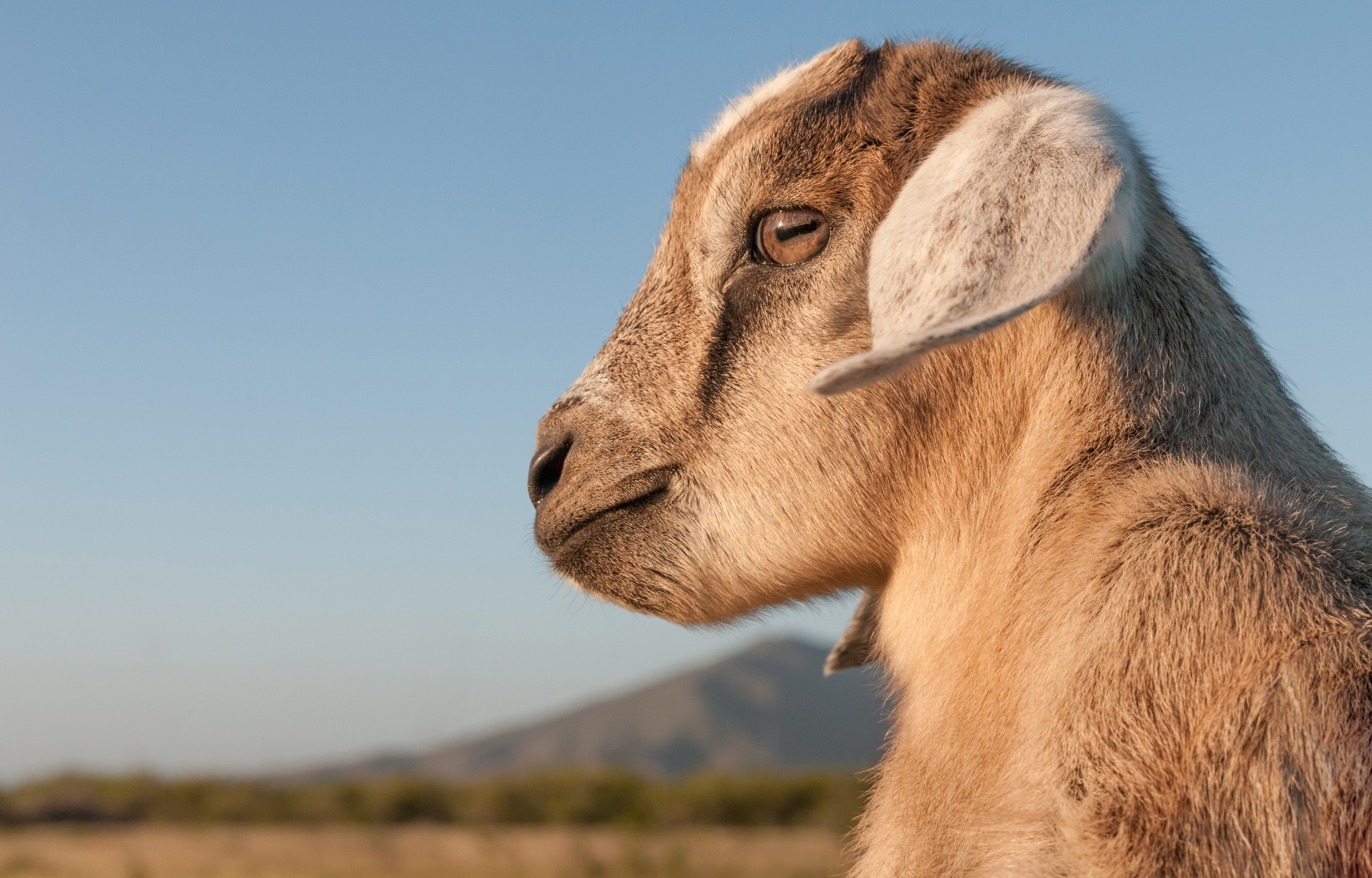
Mountain goat in Venezuela

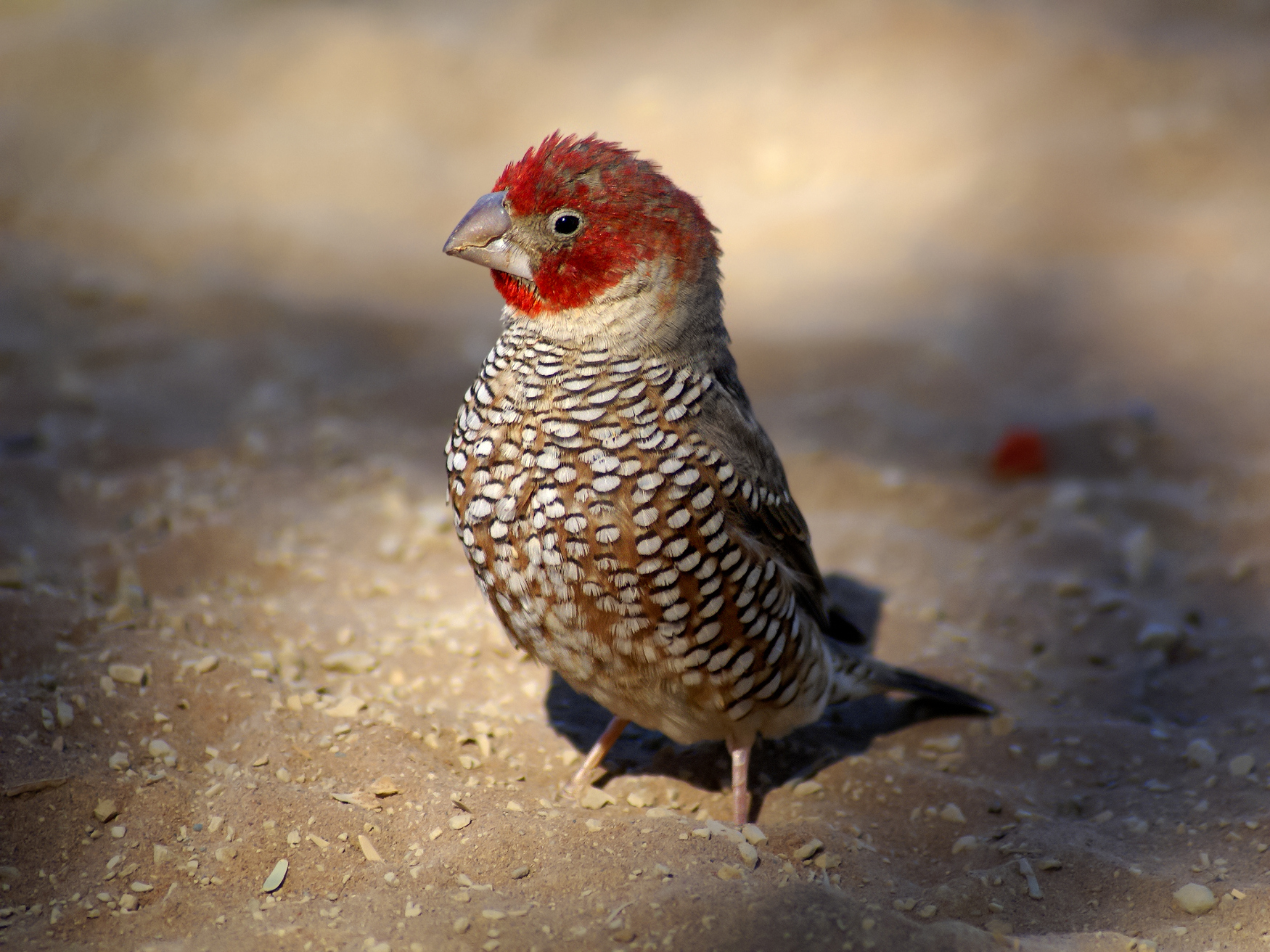
Finch

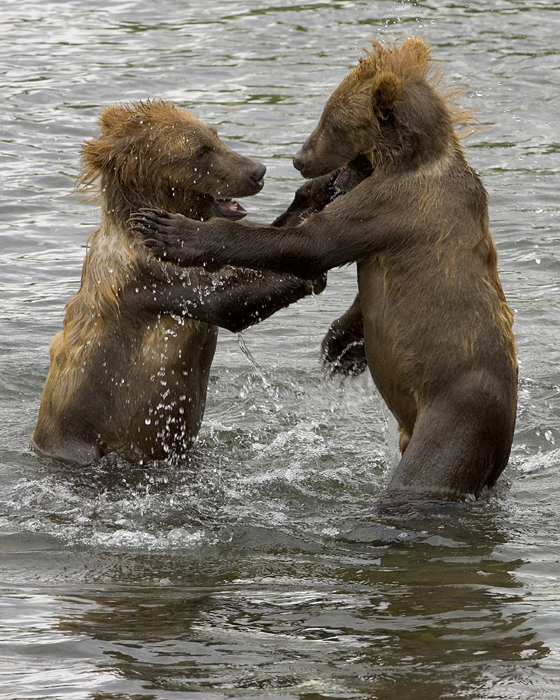
Playing bear cubs

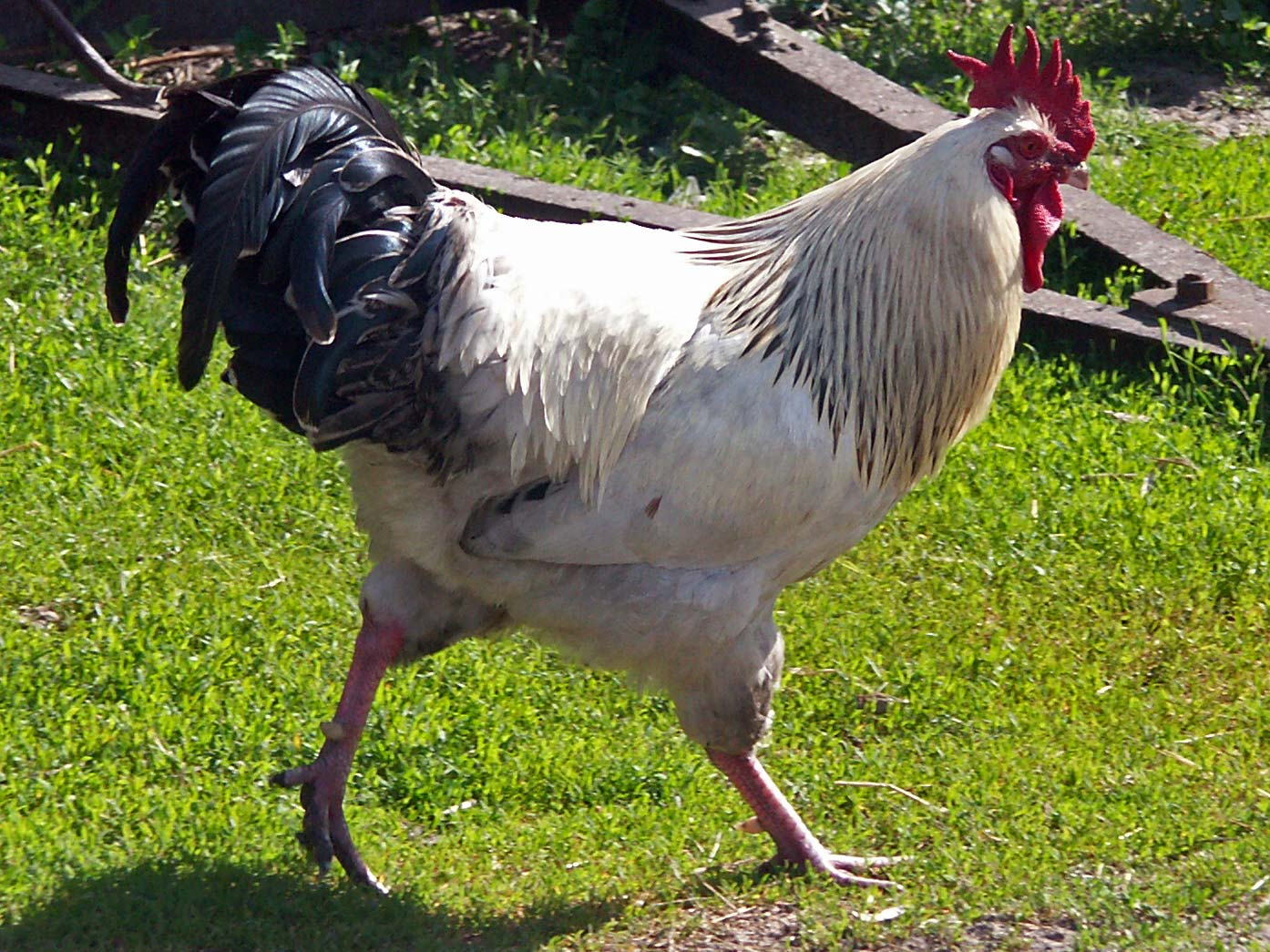
White rooster

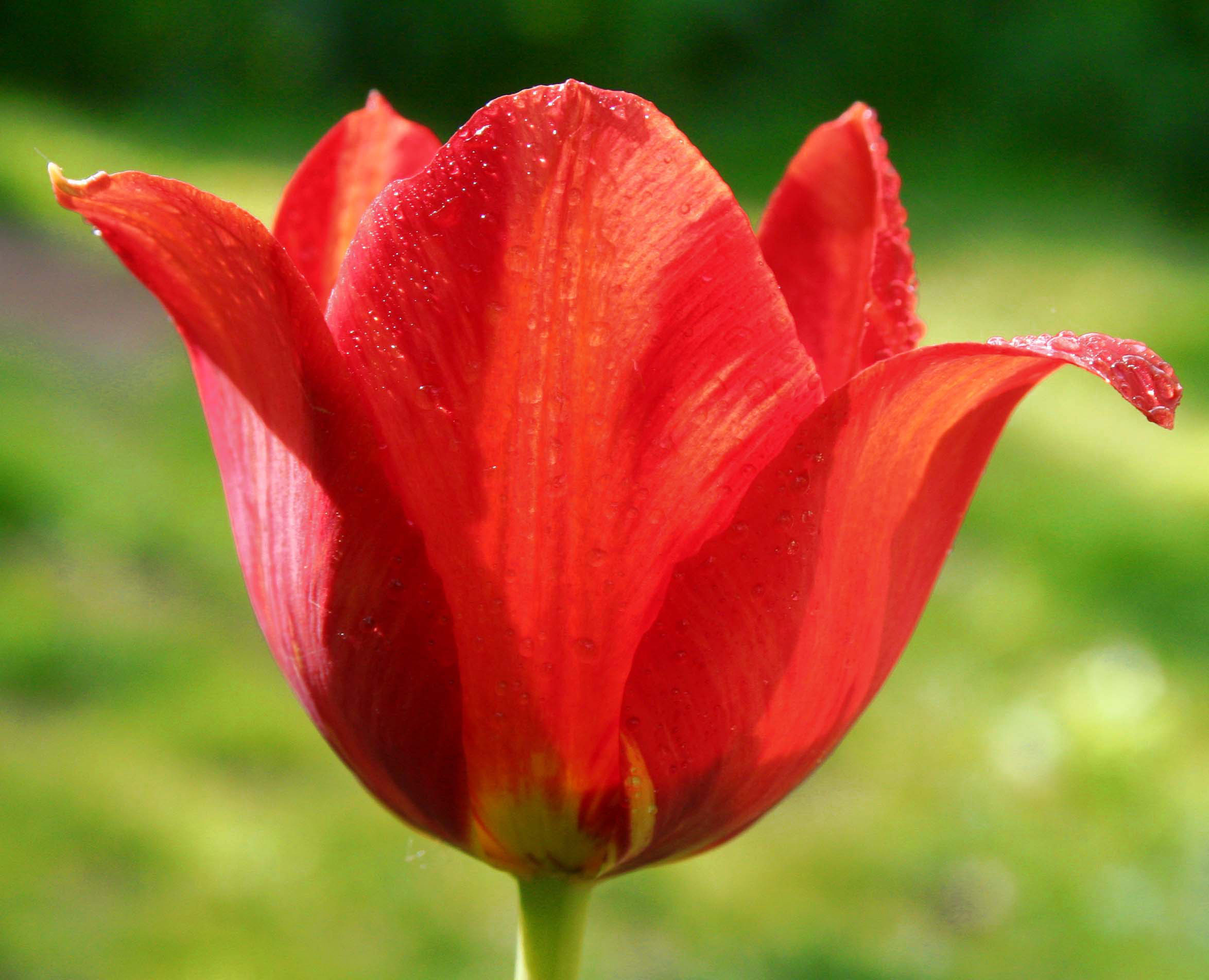
Common tulip

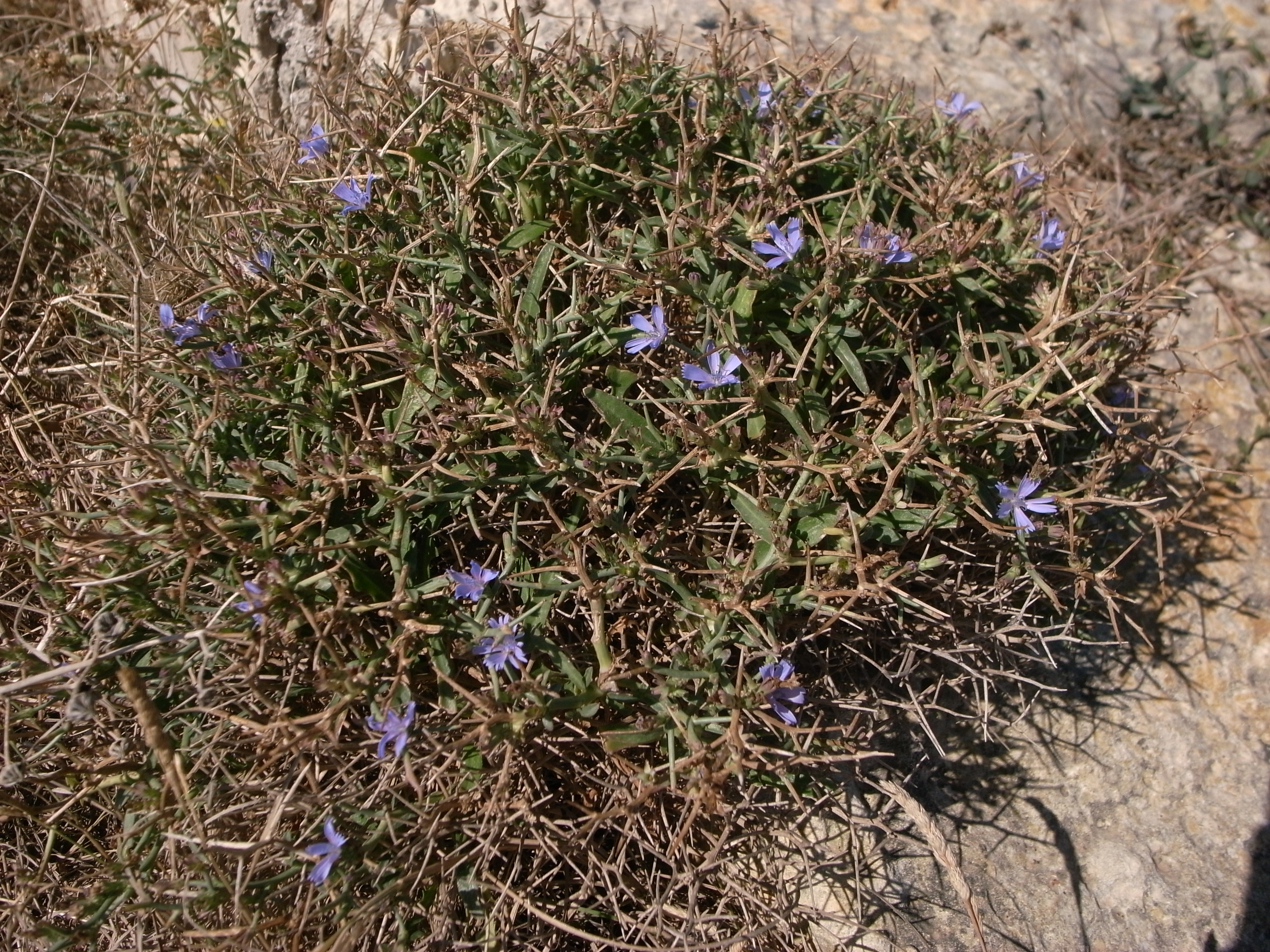
Chicory (only the grass, without flowers, was used on the dining room table)

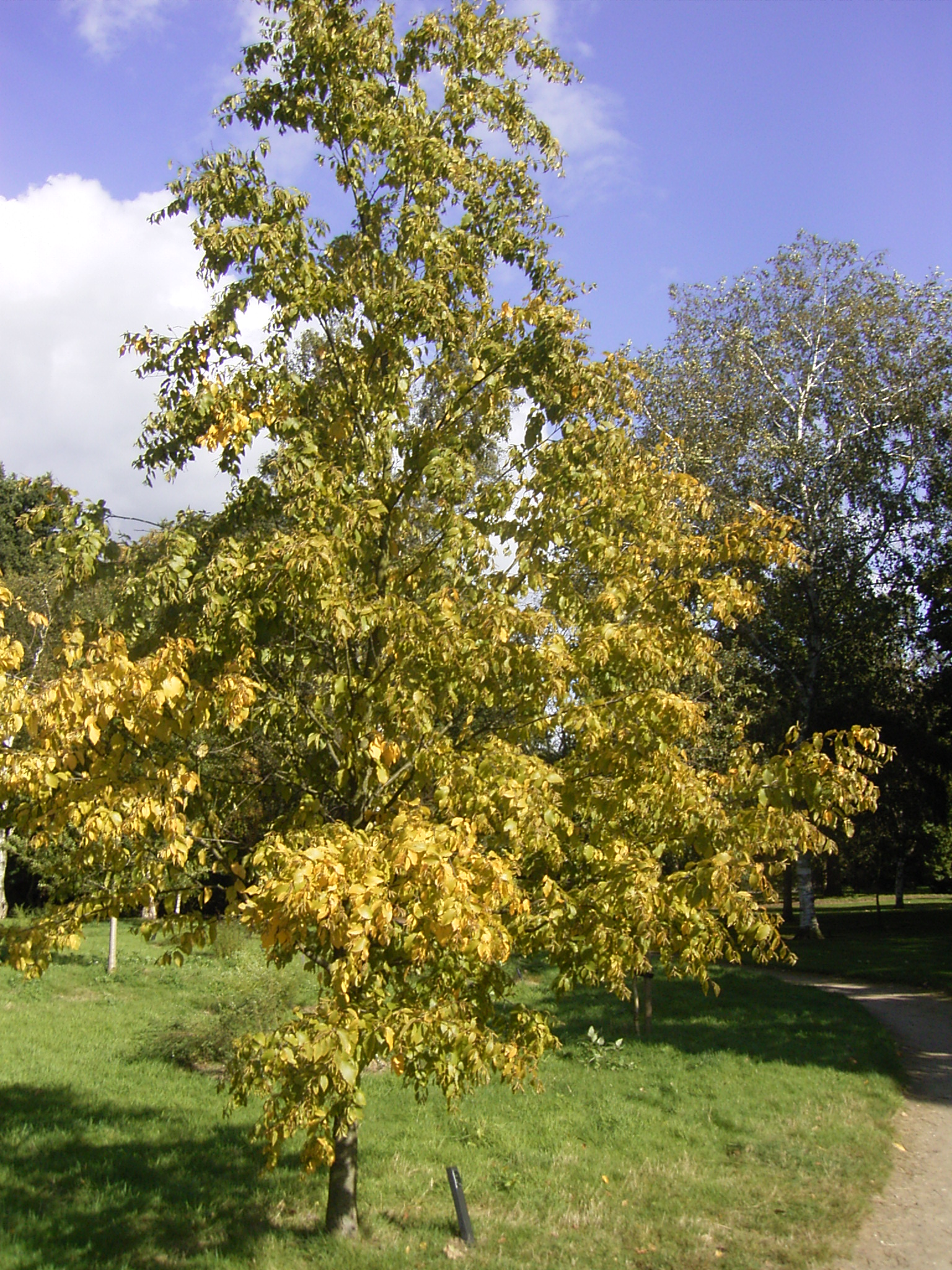
Young birch tree

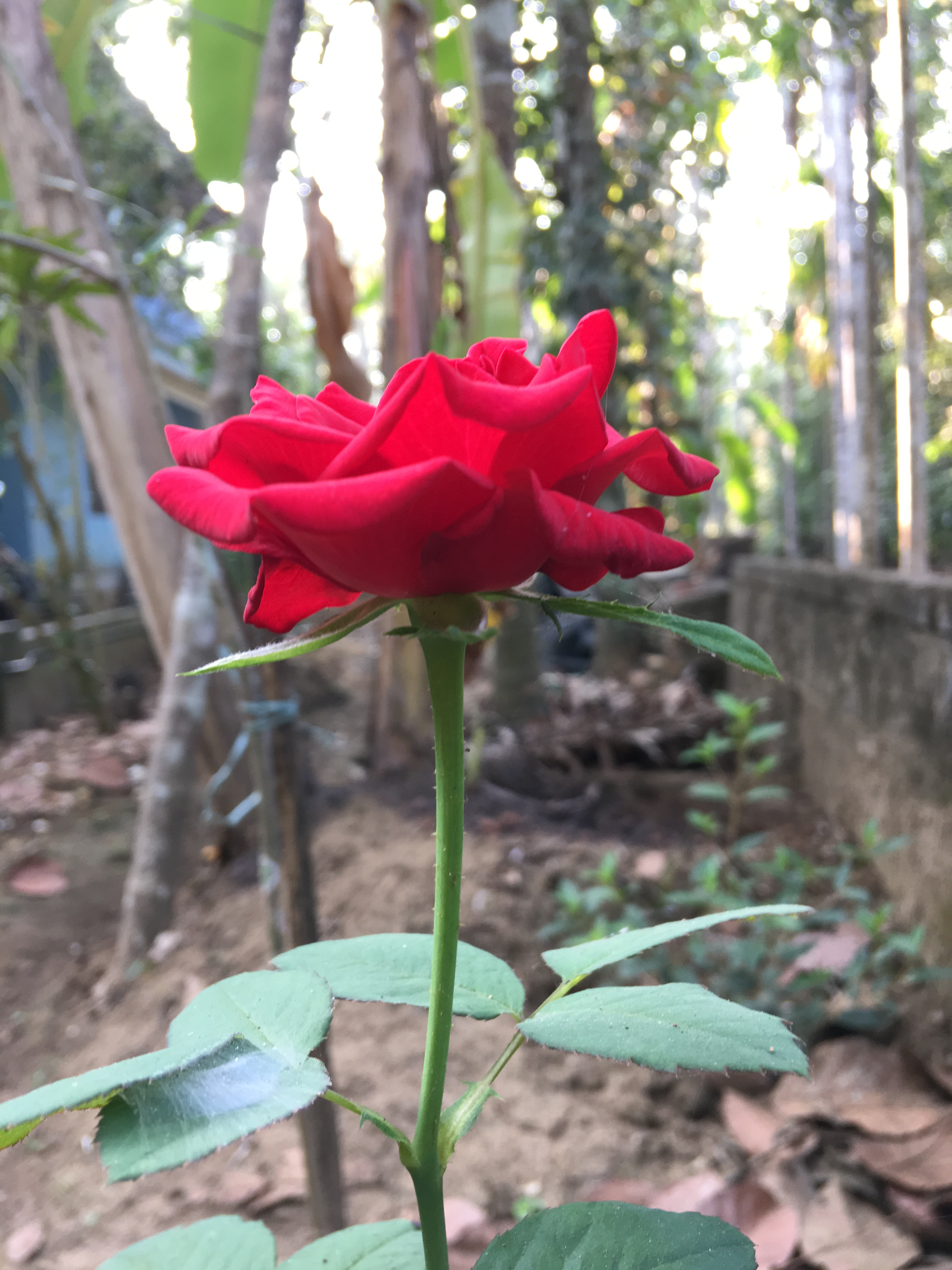
Red rose (mentioned by Elena Bulgakova)

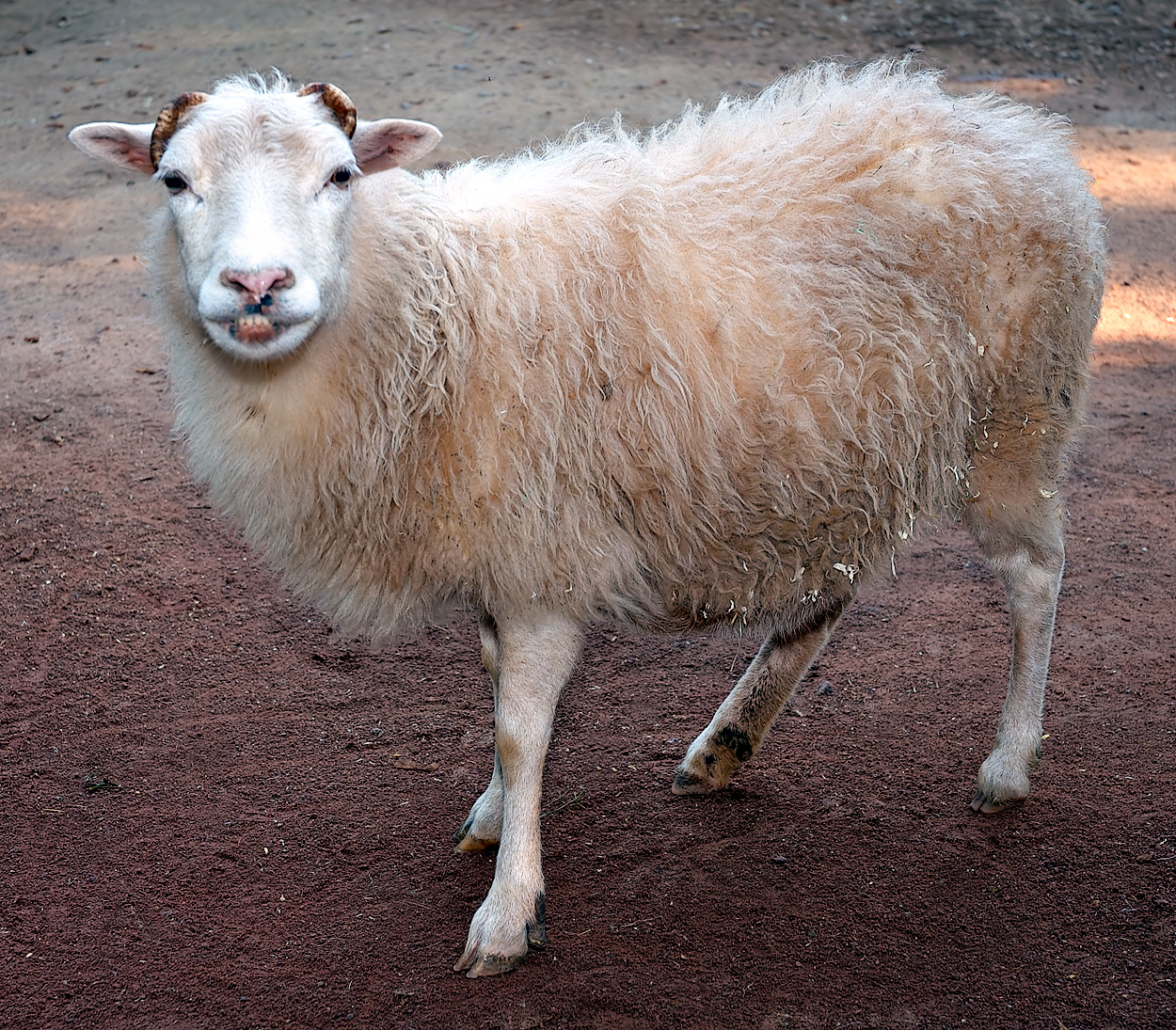
Sheep (mentioned by Elena Bulgakova)

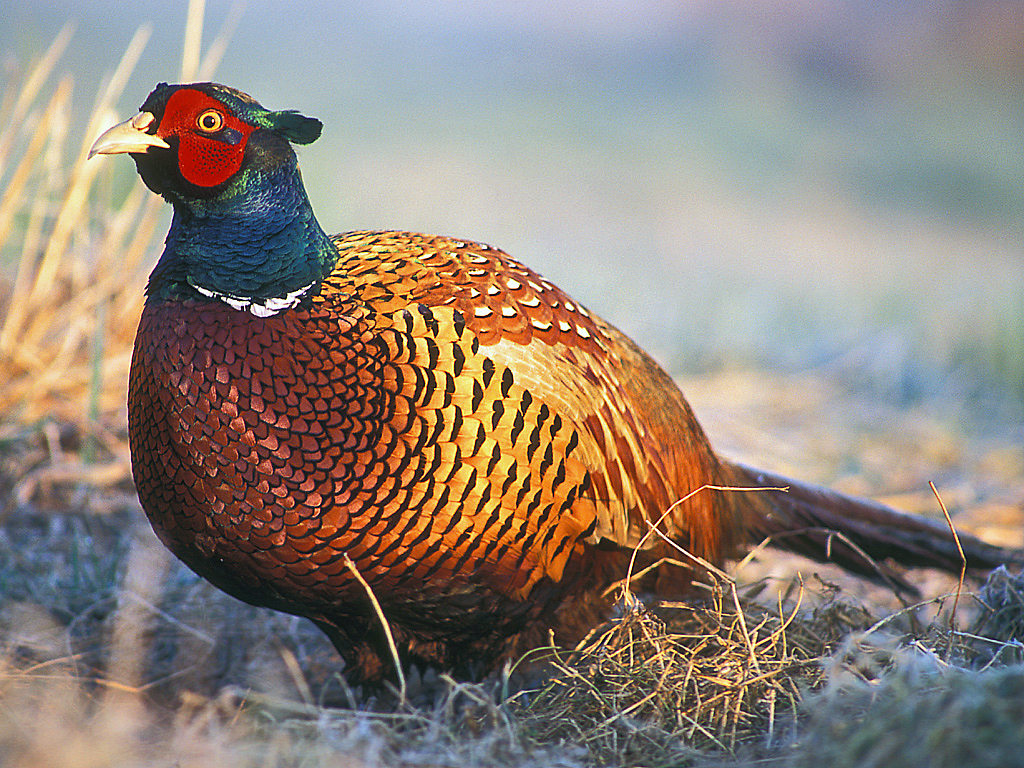
Male pheasant (mentioned by Charles Thayer)

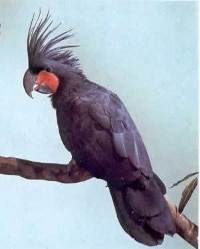
Parrot (mentioned by Charles Thayer)

== The Spring Festival ==
According to Charles Thayer's memoirs, the festival began with Ambassador Bullitt and Counselor Wiley, dressed in white bow ties, tailcoats, and white gloves, standing under the chandelier in the ballroom awaiting guests. They chased after a zebra finch that had slipped through the gilded netting, attempting in vain to catch it. Following this, the ambassador engaged in a debate with one of the first arrivals, Ivy Low Litvinov, the English writer and wife of the People's Commissar for Foreign Affairs Maxim Litvinov. The discussion centered on the class nature of the barnyard at Spaso House. Ivy insisted it was a kolkhoz, and to prove her point, she took a goat onto her lap and held it throughout the event. The American diplomats' attempts to convince her it was a "perfectly ordinary capitalist barnyard" were unsuccessful. Irena Wiley commented on the situation: "Mrs. Litvinov, the wife of the foreign minister, passionately clutched one of the kids to her ample bosom all night".

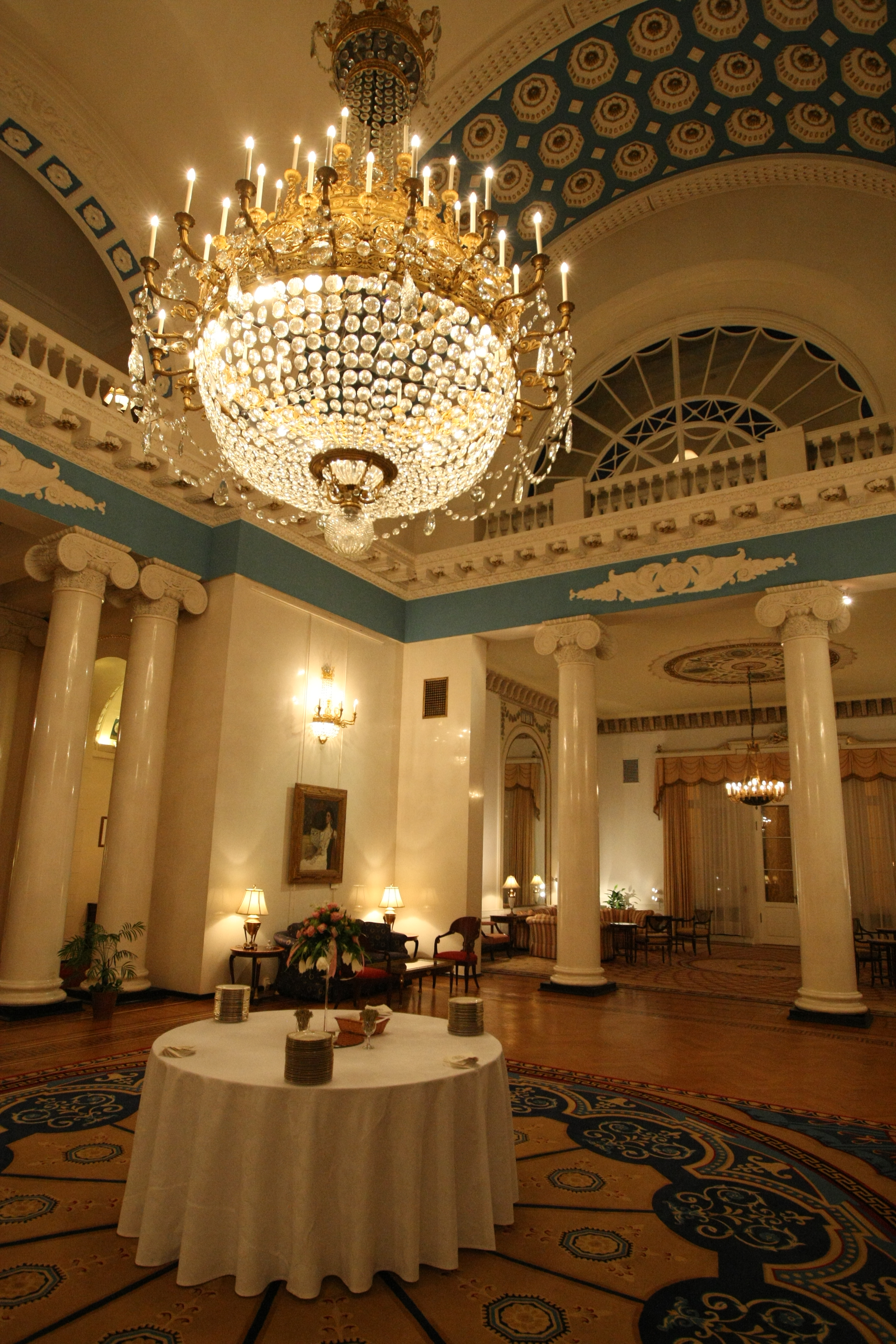
Chandelier Room in Spaso House, 2010

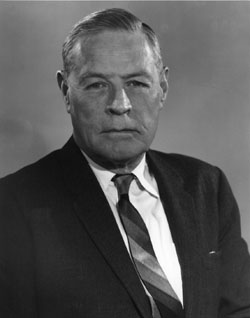
Charles Bohlen

Guests began arriving at Spaso House around midnight. According to Charles Thayer, notable figures in attendance included Politburo members People's Commissar for Defense Kliment Voroshilov, People's Commissar for Railways and concurrently chairman of the Party Control Commission of the All-Union Communist Party (Bolsheviks) Lazar Kaganovich, editor-in-chief of the newspaper Izvestia Nikolai Bukharin, military leaders such as Chief of the Red Army Staff Alexander Yegorov, Deputy People's Commissar for Defense Mikhail Tukhachevsky, cavalry inspector Semyon Budyonny, and prominent publicist and head of the International Information Bureau of the Central Committee of the All-Union Communist Party (Bolsheviks) and the international department of Izvestia Karl Radek (unlike others, he wore a tourist outfit). Also present was the People's Commissariat for Education Andrey Bubnov (dressed in a khaki suit). About 500 people attended the event. Also present was a well-known informant, referred to as "our household GPU" by Andrey Bubnov's wife, former baron Boris Shteiger.

External image
- Trepak

According to Irena Wiley, the dining room was the most impressive space during the festival: tables covered with grass and swaying tulips, roosters in glass cages around the room, goats prancing in one corner, a sleeping bear cub in another, and white birches forming lacy patterns along the white walls. The ballroom, with its marble walls, described as "dreary and austere," was enlivened by flowers projected onto the walls. Fishing nets, painted gold and treated with glue, were stretched around four large marble columns at the end of the hall. The improvised cage was filled with hundreds of small zebra finches, chirping and flying merrily behind the gilded netting. The ballroom's lamps were turned off, but a moon and surrounding constellations were lit on the ceiling. Chaos ensued when the dancing began: "Mustachioed General Budyonny, a Cossack and the last great cavalry leader in history, danced the trepak, his center of gravity almost touching the floor, arms crossed over his chest, and legs moving like locomotive pistons." The orchestra's sounds and bright lights frightened the birds, causing "heart-rending panic" as they beat against the netting for hours, with many escaping the cage.

When everything was ready for the festival's start, the covers were removed from the roosters' glass cages (Alexander Etkind noted this occurred at 3 am), intended to make them crow, but only one did so, according to Thayer. The mood was spoiled by another rooster that broke the bottom of its cage and flew onto a dish of foie gras delivered from Strasbourg the previous day. Thayer recounted, secondhand, another incident from the festival. The bear cub, holding a bottle of milk, climbed onto Karl Radek's back. The journalist took the bottle and gave the cub a bottle of champagne with a nipple attached (Irena Wiley claimed Radek poured champagne into the cub's bottle). The cub took a few sips before tossing the bottle aside. Alexander Yegorov, noticing the cub, picked it up and placed it on his shoulder, as one would with a baby needing to burp after feeding. When Charles Thayer entered the room, he saw Yegorov's uniform, adorned with medals and ribbon bars, covered in the cub's vomit, with waiters bustling around, trying to clean it with handkerchiefs and finger bowls. The shouting and cursing military leader left the ambassador's residence in a huff but returned later (within an hour, according to Wiley) in a new tunic, laughing and saying, "Children are children, even if they are bears". In Wiley's version, Yegorov "looked tenderly" at the cub in his arms, but the cub soiled "unhousebreak" the general's dress uniform.

Elena Bulgakova, invited to the ball with her husband, noted that all male attendees wore tailcoats, with only a few in jackets or tuxedos. She wrote in her diary that the embassy's invitation, received on March 29, specified that guests should wear tailcoats or black jackets. At the time, Mikhail Bulgakov had neither (Doctor of Philology Marietta Chudakova claimed this detail was absent from the original diary entry and was added by Elena Bulgakova in the 1950s from memory). The writer attended in a black suit (specially purchased with fine English fabric for the festival), (Note: In Vera Chebotaryova's record of the writer's wife's memoirs, it is stated that the Bulgakovs could not find decent black silk for the tailcoat's lining, so they abandoned it. The published diary only mentions the inability to acquire a shirt for the tailcoat fabric.) complemented by black shoes and black silk socks. The writer's wife wore an "evening dress, dark blue with pale pink flowers". (Note: Marietta Chudakova, without citing a specific page, claimed Elena Bulgakova's diary included a note about her preparations for the ball: "In the afternoon, I was at the hairdresser's. On Arbat, I approached cars to hire a Taxi. A driver came out. 'Please!' I told him I'd pay 40 rubles to drive us in the evening and pick us up at 3 a.m. He eagerly agreed. The dressmaker and Tamara Tomasovna dressed me. The dress—evening, dark blue with pale pink flowers—turned out very well". This passage is absent from the 1990 and 2004 diary editions.) The couple arrived at midnight. They were greeted in the vestibule by military attaché Philip R. Faymonville (a lieutenant colonel at the time, later a brigadier general) and embassy secretary Charles Eustis Bohlen. Elena Bulgakova noted the presence of numerous Soviet cultural figures: director and artistic leader of Second MXAT Ivan Bersenjev with his wife, actress and director of the same theater Sofya Giatsintova, artistic leader and chief director of the Vsevolod Meyerhold State Theatre, People's Artist of the USSR Vsevolod Meyerhold, and his wife, actress and first wife of Sergei Yesenin Zinaida Raikh, director and artistic leader of MXAT, People's Artist of the USSR Vladimir Nemirovich-Danchenko with his personal secretary and MXAT directorate secretary Olga Bokshanskaya, and creator and artistic leader of the Kamerny Theatre Alexander Tairov with his wife, actress Alisa Koonen, and writer and playwright Alexander Afinogenov.

Guests at the Spaso House reception on April 24, 1935

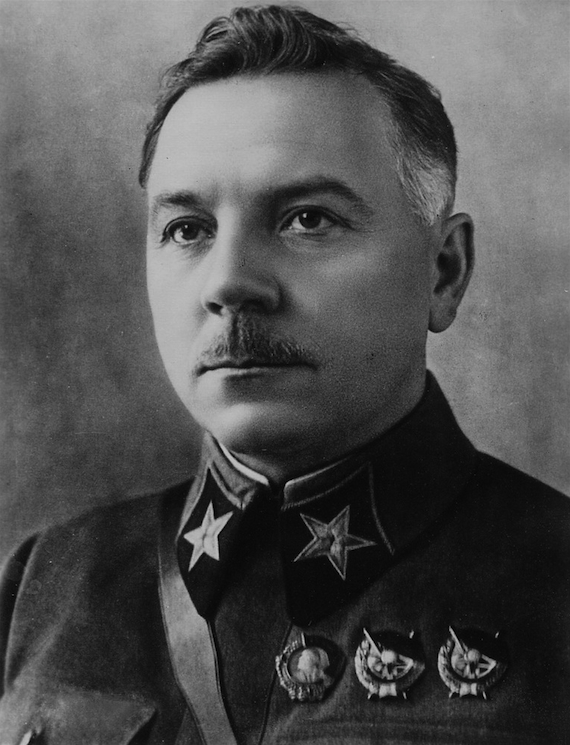
Kliment Voroshilov, 1937

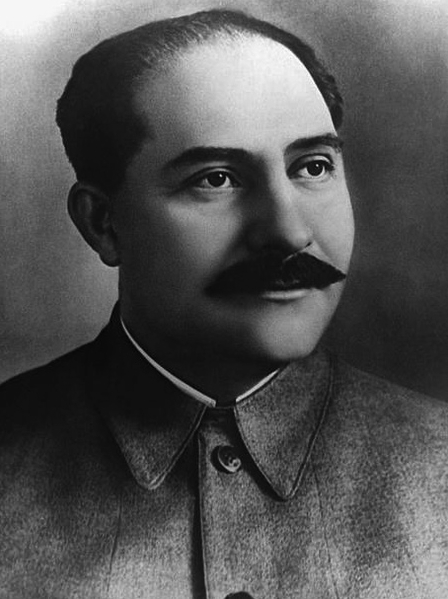
Lazar Kaganovich, 1930s

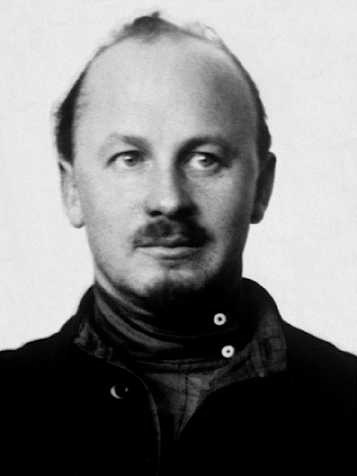
Nikolai Bukharin, before 1930

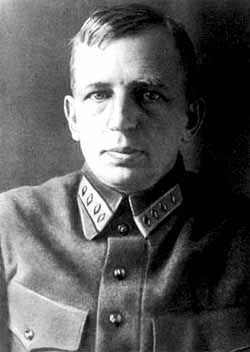
Andrey Bubnov, between 1920 and 1930

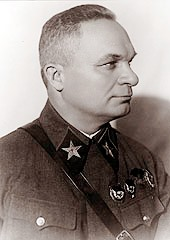
Alexander Yegorov

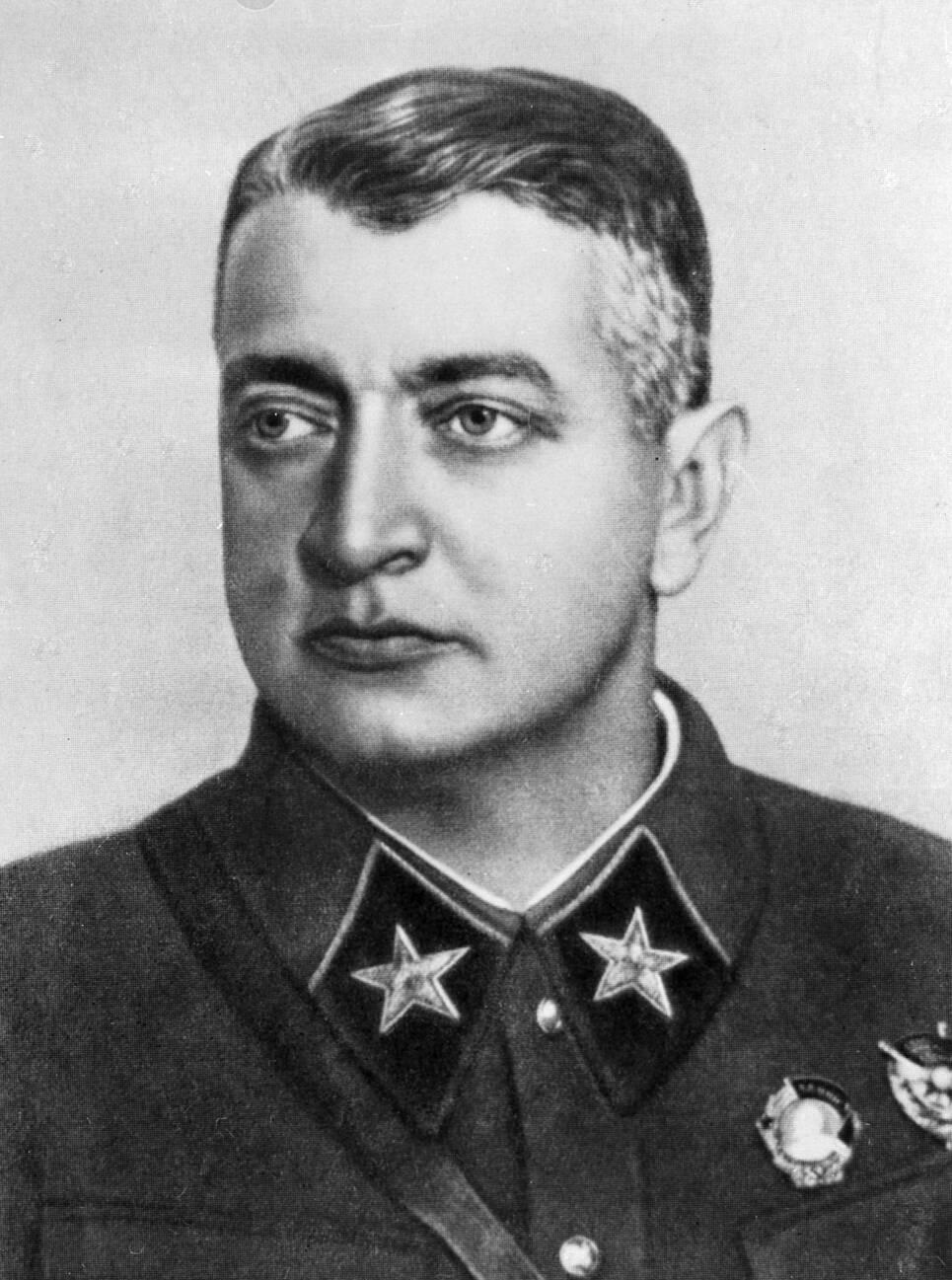
Mikhail Tukhachevsky, before 1937

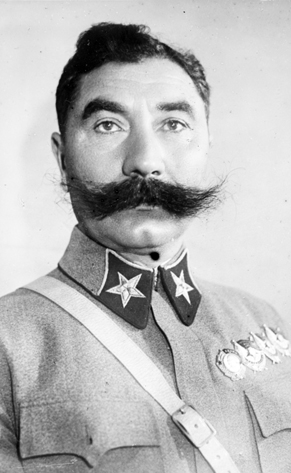
Semyon Budyonny, 1930s

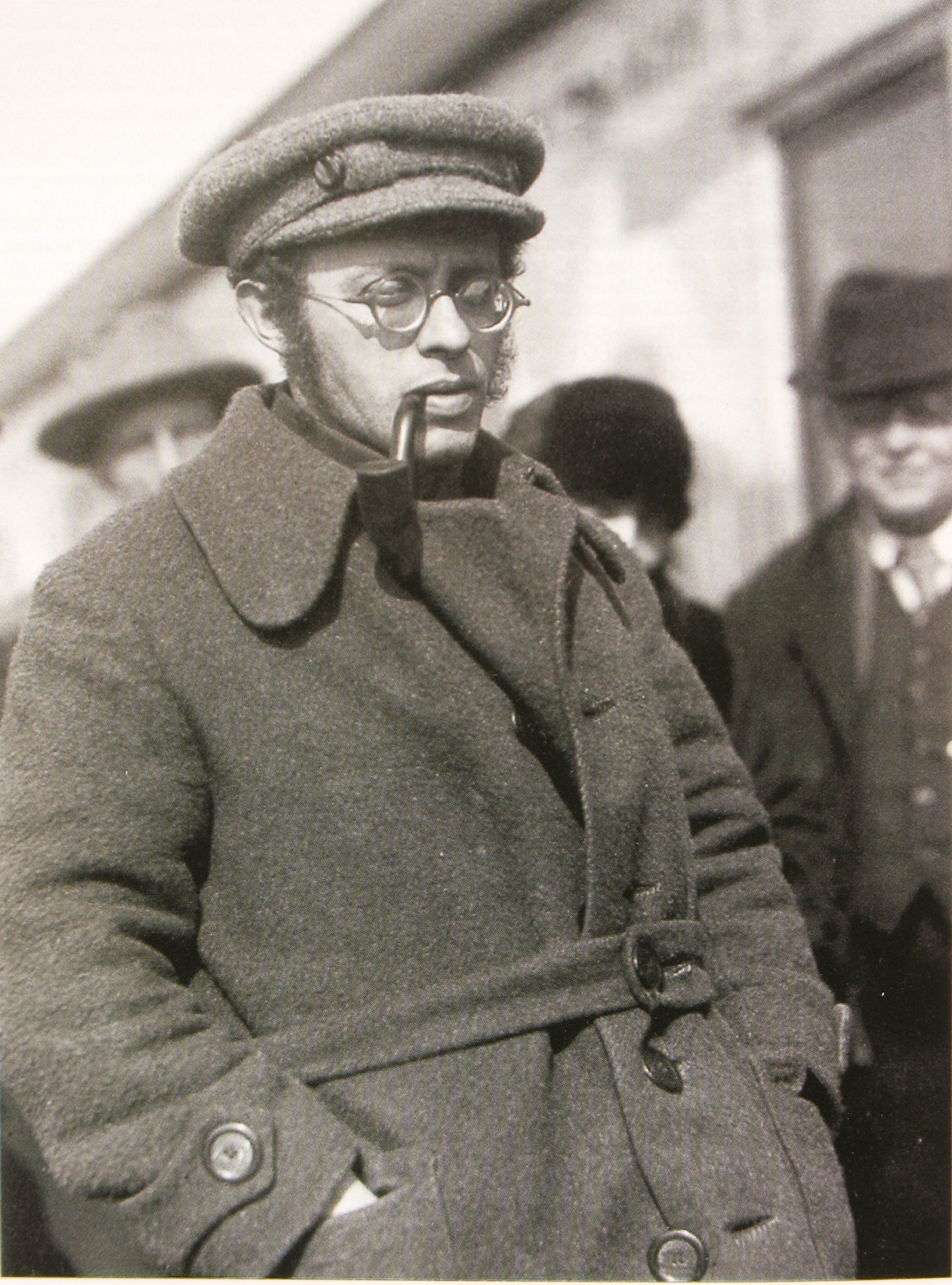
Karl Radek, between 1927 and 1935

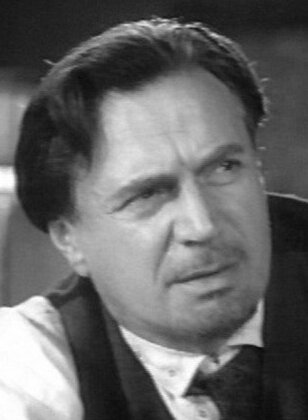
Ivan Bersenjev, between 1937 and 1939

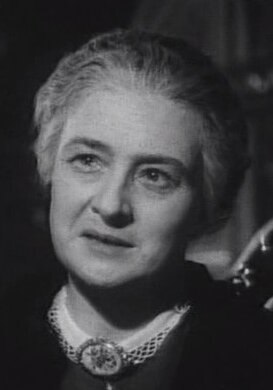
Sofya Giatsintova, 1946

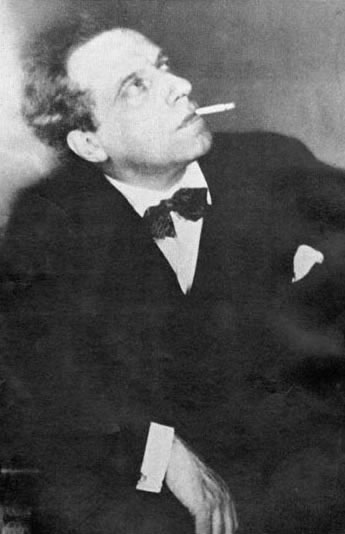
Vsevolod Meyerhold

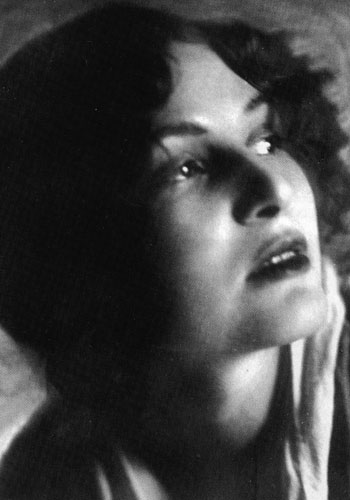
Zinaida Raikh, 1937

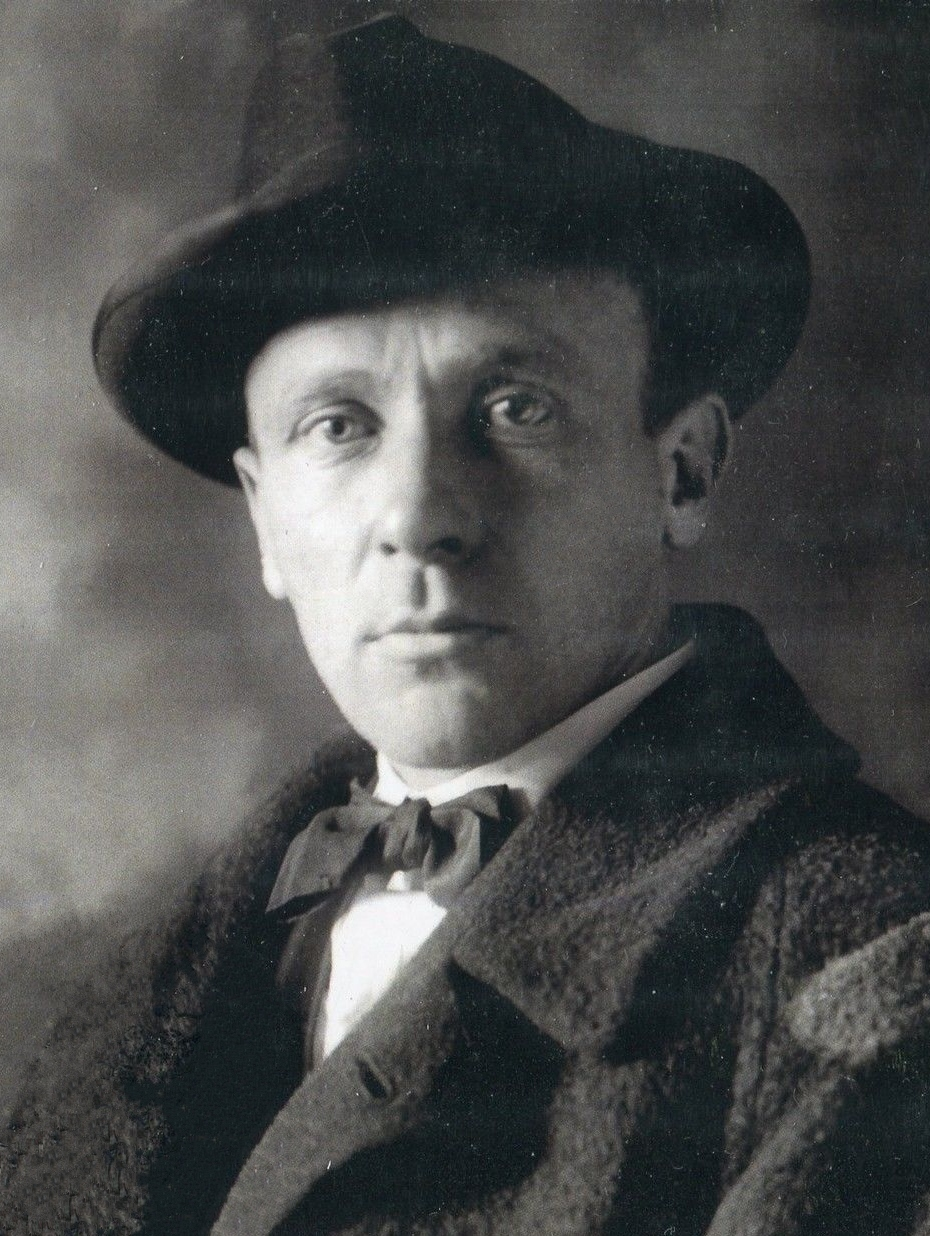
Mikhail Bulgakov, 1928

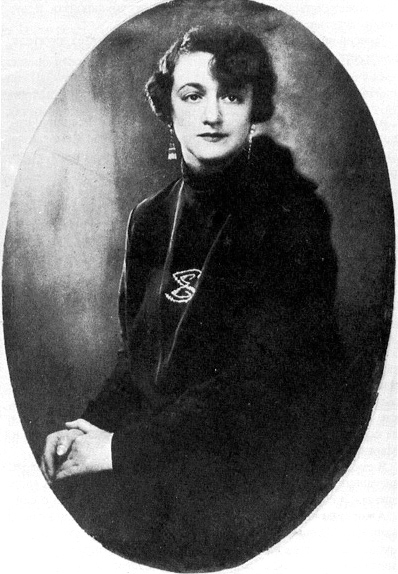
Elena Bulgakova, 1928

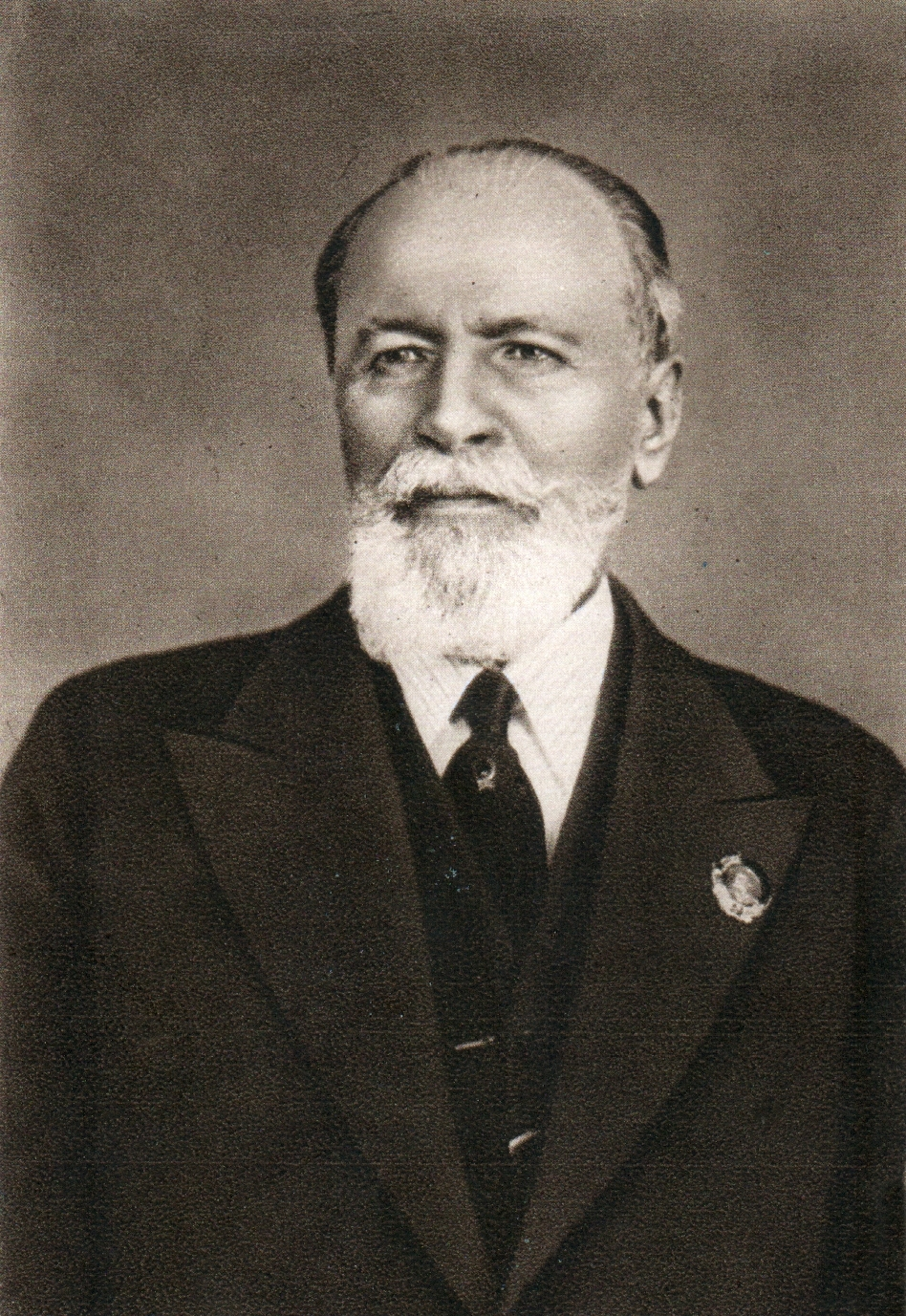
Vladimir Nemirovich-Danchenko, 1937

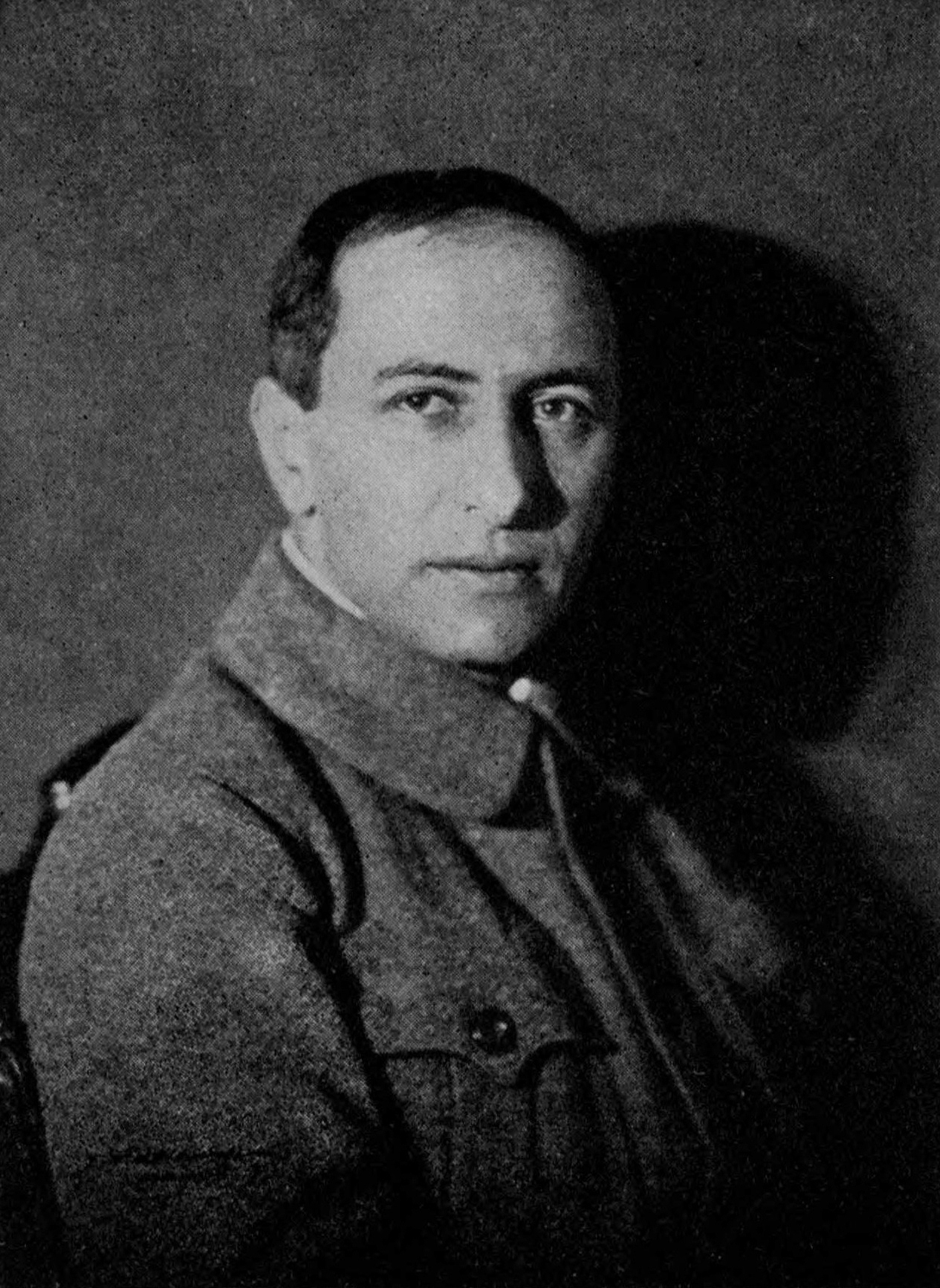
Alexander Tairov, circa 1920

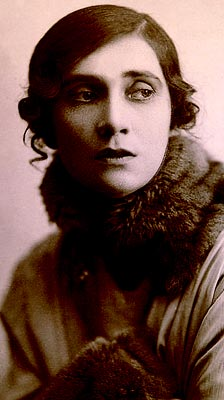
Alisa Koonen, before 1917

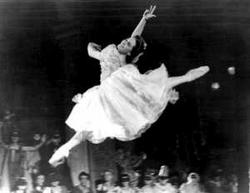
Olga Lepeshinskaya as Kitri, 1940

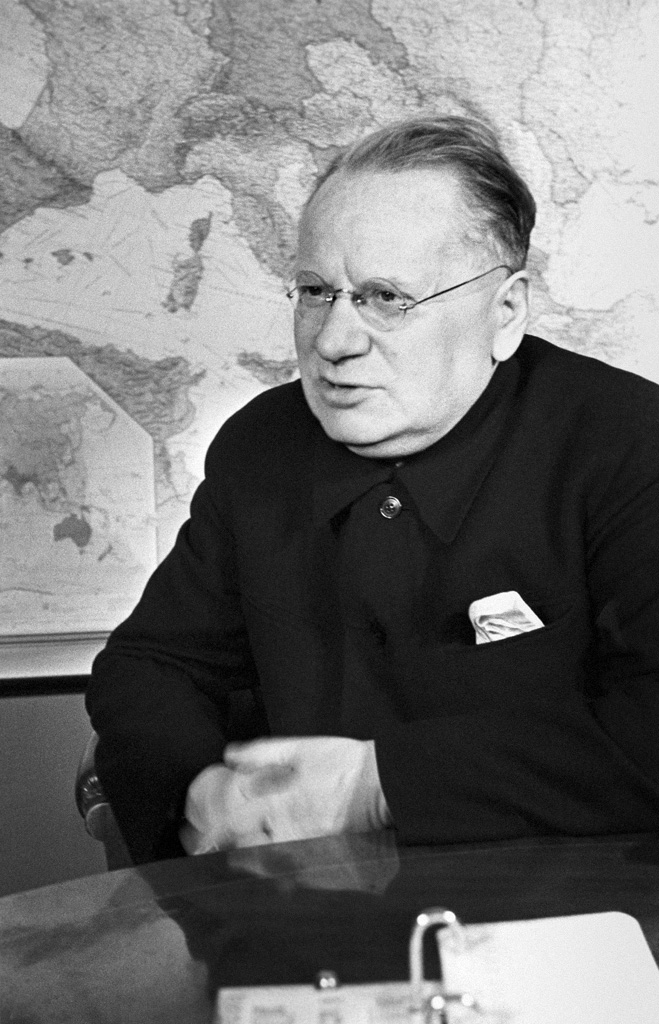
Maxim Litvinov, 1937

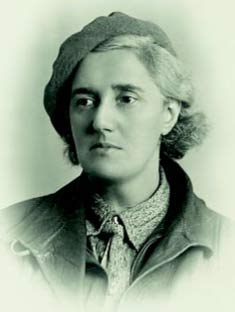
Ivy Low (Litvinova), 1920s

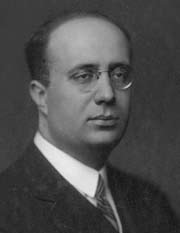
Huseyin Vasıf Çınar, 1920s

Elena Bulgakova noted that the dinner took place in a dining room specially added to the embassy mansion, with separate tables arranged. In the corners, compartments housed kids, lambs, and bear cubs. Cages with roosters lined the walls, and "around three o'clock, harmonicas played, and the roosters began to crow." Bulgakova described the style used by the organizers as "style russe." A shashlik restaurant on the second floor served red wine, while champagne was served on the first floor. The couple tried to leave at three in the morning, but the Americans allowed them to depart only at six. They were driven home in an embassy Cadillac, and Elena Bulgakova received a large bouquet of tulips from Charles Bohlen as a farewell gift. (Note: Marietta Chudakova quoted Bulgakova's diary (without specifying page or edition): "We wanted to leave at 3:30 a.m., but they wouldn't let us. Then Misha went out, found our driver, who appeared as if from nowhere, and dismissed him. We left at 5:30 a.m. in one of the embassy cars, having invited some embassy Americans to our place". This passage is absent from the 1990 and 2004 diary editions.) Irena Wiley described the festival's conclusion differently, stating that as morning arrived, the roosters began crowing in unison, but the guests did not leave: "It was nine o'clock when the last of them reluctantly began to exit onto the street".

External image
- Lezginka

The final event of the festival, noted by Charles Thayer, was a Georgian dance (Alexander Etkind identified it as a Lezginka and timed it at 9 am), performed by Mikhail Tukhachevsky at 10 a.m. the next day with the recently celebrated Bolshoi Theatre ballerina Olga Lepeshinskaya. By 10:30 am, the last guests departed, including the Turkish ambassador Vasıf Çınar and head of the Press and Information Department of the People's Commissariat for Foreign Affairs Konstantin Umansky. Only then did Thayer, as he admitted in his memoirs, allow himself a glass of champagne. After recapturing escaped pheasants, parrots, and some zebra finches, he went to bed but was soon summoned by the ambassador, who reprimanded him for the birds that had escaped again. A birdcatcher from the Moscow Zoo admitted he could not catch the scattered birds using his usual methods. Thayer gathered the embassy staff, turned off the house's lights, and opened the windows. Bright lamps were placed at each window to attract the finches. The staff went room by room, using brooms and pillows to drive the birds toward the light. It took about three hours to clear the premises of the small birds. Irena Wiley described it differently: "For several days, the ambassador's residence was filled with flying finches. Brocade furniture was covered with their excrement…"

Charles Thayer admitted that the Spring Festival was the last event he was entrusted to organize. However, Bullitt wrote to President Franklin D. Roosevelt on May 1, 1935: "It was an extremely successful reception, very dignified and at the same time cheerful… Undoubtedly, it was the best reception in Moscow since the Revolution". Irena Wiley echoed him: "Of course, never before and probably never in the future will the Soviet Union have such a splendid time," "it was perhaps the most cheerful party ever held in Moscow".

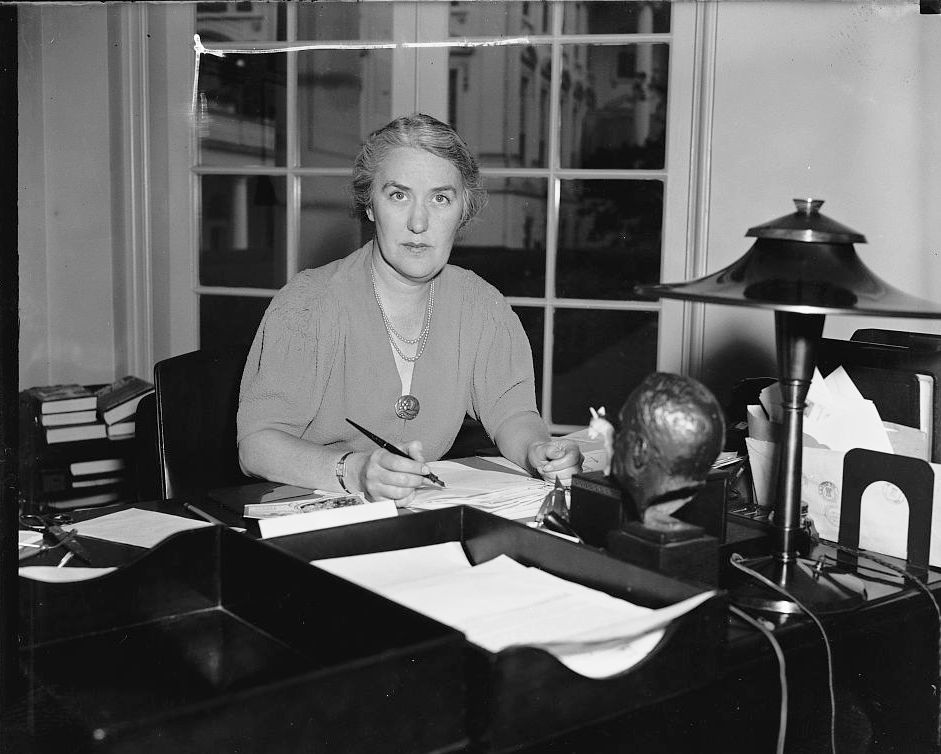
Franklin D. Roosevelt's personal secretary Marguerite LeHand in 1935

In his book Interpretation of Journeys: Russia and America in Travelogues and Intertexts (2022), Alexander Etkind compared the Spring Festival's features to the aesthetics of F. Scott Fitzgerald's novel The Great Gatsby, later immortalized, in his view, in Disneyland. Etkind noted that Vladimir Nabokov described this aesthetic with the Russian word "poshlust", considering it untranslatable. The Spring Festival at Spaso House, according to Etkind, transplanted American poshlust "onto the utterly unsuitable soil of Russian tragedy" — where victims and executioners partied together, with death awaiting both in the near future. Bulgakov was one of the few guests who survived.

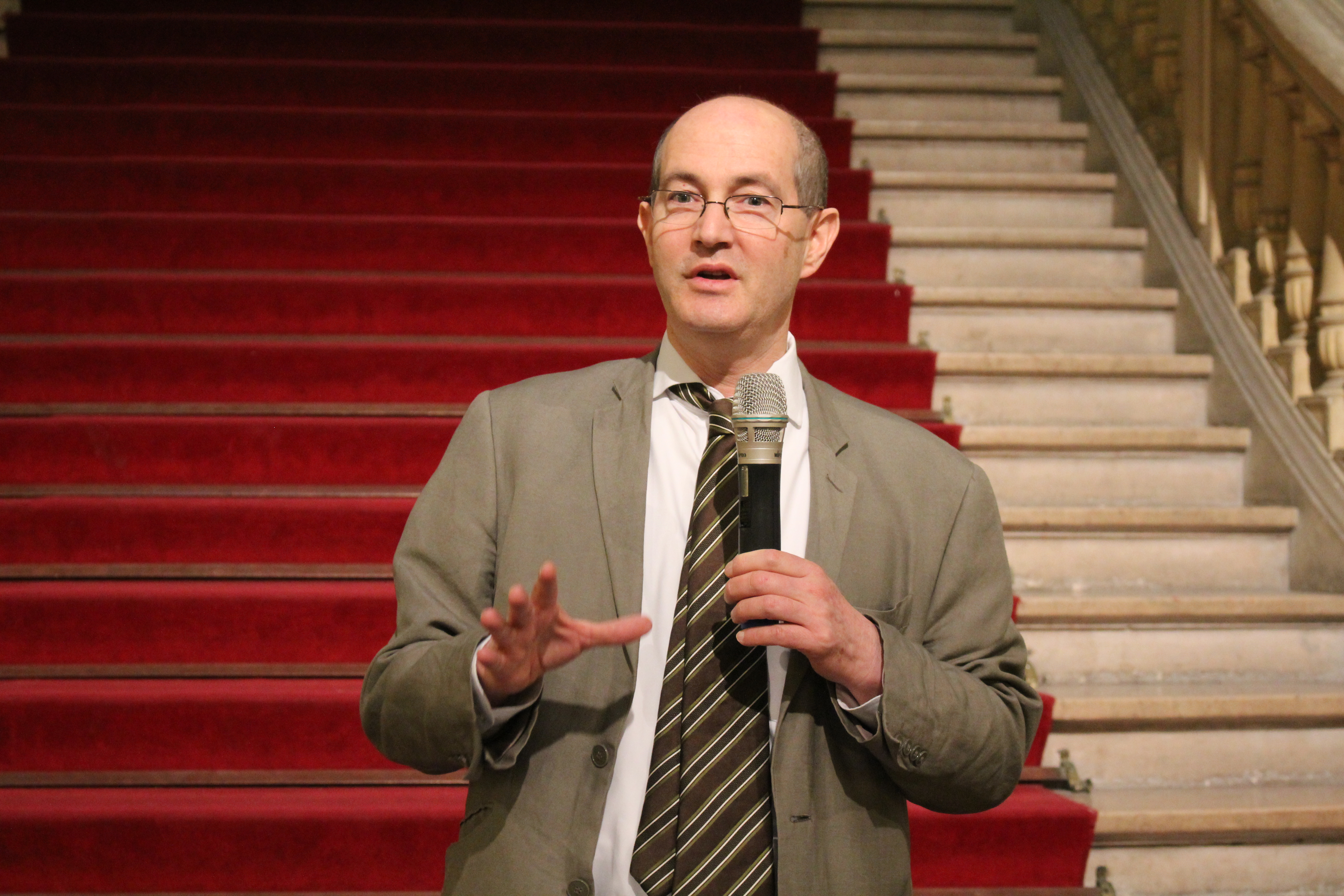
Patrick Weil in 2015

Political scientist Patrick Weil in his book The Madman in the White House: Sigmund Freud, Ambassador Bullitt, and the Lost Psychobiography of Woodrow Wilson (2023) details the party of April 24, 1935 (the book contains a typo, dating the Spring Festival to 1915 instead of 1935). The researcher claims: "It was at the ball that Bulgakov met Baron Shteiger, one of the most notorious Soviet informants". Weil further writes: "There was great enthusiasm in the White House about the ball. Roosevelt asked Marguerite LeHand to send Bullitt a newspaper clipping titled Moscow Goes High Hat'), which noted that 'humble servants of the proletariat arrived in full formal wear. They wore beautiful dresses… It was the most glamorous party Moscow had seen since the Revolution.'" Ultimately, Weil argued, the Spring Festival failed to establish friendly personal relations between American diplomats and Soviet officials. Several factors, including the disappearance of Soviet citizens, persecution of cultural figures known to the ambassador, fear among American diplomats for their own futures, and the failure of negotiations regarding Russia's debts to the U.S., exhausted William Bullitt. As evidence, Weil cites that Bullitt, already accustomed to early bedtimes, now needed a two-hour afternoon rest to recover his strength.

== Spring Festival and the Great Ball at Satan's in The Master and Margarita ==
Elena Bulgakova claimed that, inspired by the Spring Festival, her husband wrote a new version of Chapter 23 of his novel The Master and Margarita, known as the Great Ball at Satan's. She personally preferred an earlier version of this episode, (Note: Other versions of the event existed. For instance, Doctor of Philology and candidate of historical sciences Boris Sokolov mentions variants from 1929–1936, where a witches' sabbath, based on a 1670 Swedish witch trial, replaced the ball.) which she called the "small ball." In that version, the events took place in Woland's bedroom (in Stepan Likhodeev's room). According to Elena Bulgakova, the writer even destroyed the earlier version when his wife left the house.

Alexander Etkind disagreed with this perspective: "As for the Great Ball at Satan's in The Master and Margarita, it seems to have little to do with the American Spring Festival, which was conceived more in the style of F. Scott Fitzgerald's The Great Gatsby. Bulgakov emphasizes only one category of guests at Satan's Ball — "individuals who committed sex crimes." Moreover, "naked and beautiful sinners arrive at the Great Ball alongside their seducers and rapists." However, Etkind noted that while "few political criminals attended Satan's Ball this time, they came from contemporary Moscow streets." Among them, Etkind identifies the Plenipotentiary of the People's Commissariat for Education for Foreign Affairs, Boris Shteiger, and the People's Commissar for Internal Affairs Genrikh Yagoda, who, according to his own testimony during his trial, attempted to poison his deputy Nikolai Yezhov.

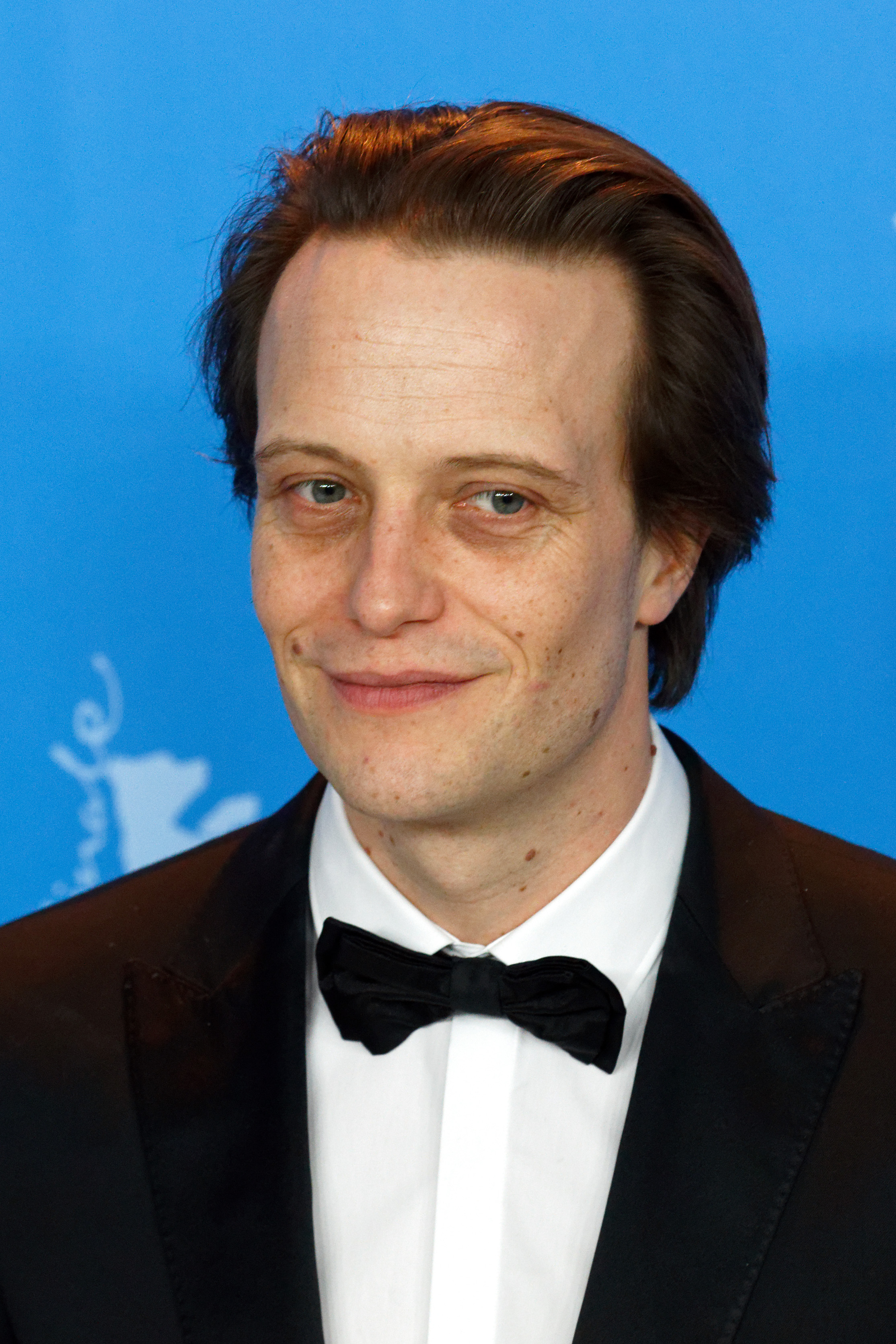
August Diehl as Woland in the 2024 film The Master and Margarita, 2017

Etkind noted that the descriptions of the Spring Festival by Elena Bulgakova and Charles Thayer bear almost no resemblance to the Great Ball at Satan's. However, a few minor details align:

- The sound of wings heard several times during the evening, according to Etkind, corresponds to the numerous birds borrowed by Thayer from the Moscow Zoo, which escaped their cages and flew throughout the building.
- The adventures of the pilot sent by the Americans to Crimea, the Caucasus, and then Helsinki in search of flowers for the ball resemble Likhodeev's journey.
- The tailcoat of the conductor mentioned by Elena Bulgakova correlates with the "unprecedentedly long tailcoat of marvelous cut" worn by Woland, though in the Variety Theatre, not at the Great Ball. Etkind believes the mention of the tailcoat was absent from Bulgakova's diary written contemporaneously and was added in the early 1960s during her editing of the diary. This is typically explained by the fact that in 1935, Bulgakova did not assume her husband drew on Spring Festival events for The Master and Margarita. When editing the diary, she was aware of this and "retrieved from memory half-forgotten details that had not initially caught her attention".

Etkind argued that Bulgakova was not so much documenting what she witnessed as attempting to explain "a certain fact known to her from her husband's account, but unclear and thus noteworthy during diary revisions." According to Etkind, Bulgakov, while discussing with his wife which version of the Great Ball at Satan's to retain in the novel, drew a parallel between it and the Spring Festival. This parallel remained unclear to Elena Bulgakova. Etkind attempted to argue that William Bullitt, to some extent, served as a prototype for Woland in the novel.

Doctor of Philology Alexey Varlamov in his 2008 biography of Bulgakov, published in the series The Lives of Remarkable People, was highly cautious about the Spring Festival's influence on the writer's novel. He only acknowledged the event as the "pinnacle" of Bulgakov's interactions with American embassy staff. Regarding Etkind's theory that William Bullitt was a prototype for Woland, Varlamov commented that it "seems to us, in its own way, not without rational basis." However, he immediately cited a summary and quotes from American Bulgakov scholar, candidate of philological sciences Alexander Dolinin, who refuted close ties between the ambassador and the writer and called the Woland-Bullitt connection a "dilettantish hunt for prototypes." Dolinin also accused Etkind of direct falsification of one of Bullitt's statements used to support this hypothesis.

Candidate of Philology Pavel Spivakovsky, in his article The Baron's Blood in The Master and Margarita (Bulgakov's Novel as an 'Anti-Soviet' Work), was extremely brief in describing similarities between the Spring Festival and Satan's Ball. In his view, only the interior of the house where Woland's ball takes place resembles Spaso House.

Bulgakov scholar Leonid Parshin summarized eyewitness accounts and documents, concluding that the Spring Festival directly influenced Bulgakov's depiction of Satan's Ball. He noted direct parallels: numerous tulips, guests and hosts in tailcoats, live birds and harmonicas, "meat sizzling on hot coals" (shashlik), and dances. In American journalist Peter S. Bridges' article Spaso House, singing wild birds are mentioned flying under the ceiling after the reception. In The Master and Margarita, the sound of wings from scattered parrots is noted. The article included photos clearly showing a grand vestibule, colonnade, and vast room sizes. The event's name—Bullitt's Spring Ball and Bulgakov's "spring full moon ball" — is nearly identical. The murder of Baron Meigel by Azazello, according to Parshin, corresponds to the life and death of NKVD secret agent Boris Shteiger (a confidant of Avel Yenukidze, chairman of the Government Commission for the Bolshoi Theatre and MXAT), whose duties included eavesdropping on American embassy staff conversations. This was first established by Canadian Bulgakov scholar Anthony Colin Wright in his 1978 book Mikhail Bulgakov: Life and Interpretations, published in Toronto.

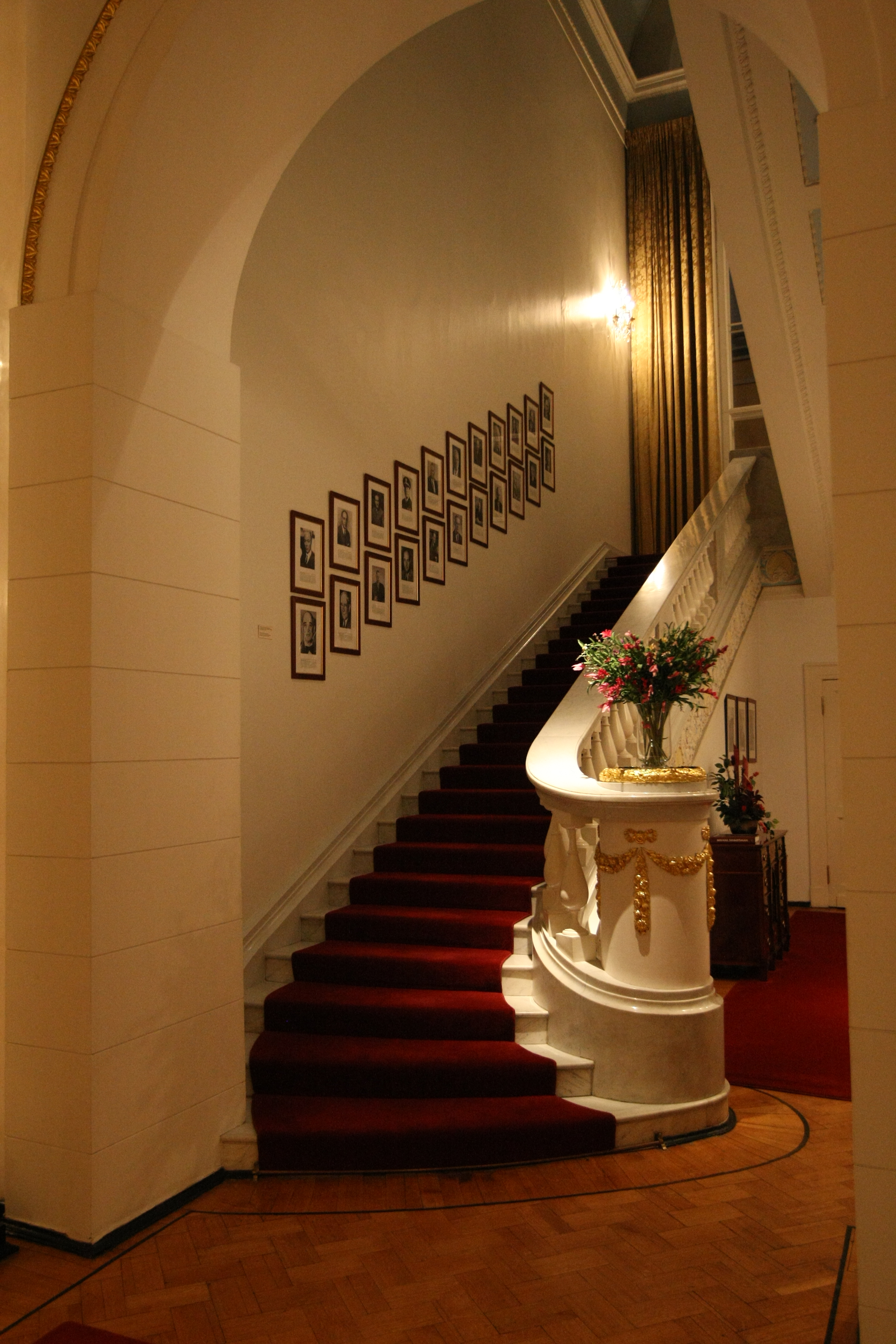
Staircase in Spaso House

According to Doctor of Philology and candidate of historical sciences Boris Sokolov, "the novel combines real features of the American ambassador's residence with details and images of distinctly literary origin". These include the memoirs of Bulgakov's second wife, Lyubov Belozerskaya, about her performances in the ballet troupe of the music hall Folies Bergère in Paris (featuring naked women alongside dressed men), an article in the Brockhaus and Efron Encyclopedic Dictionary about roses in ethnography, literature, and art (part of the writer's personal library), Andrei Bely's "Northern (First Heroic)" symphony, economist Alexander Chayanov's novella Venediktov, or Memorable Events of My Life, other literary works, press publications, or contemporary oral accounts. Sokolov argued that Nikolai Bukharin, whom Bulgakov "felt mixed contempt and pity for" at the Spring Festival, became the "lower tenant" transformed into a hog in The Master and Margarita — Nikolai Ivanovich, "visible in the moonlight down to the last button on his gray vest, to the last hair of his light goatee." Bukharin's goatee, light hair, and old-fashioned frock coat stood out to contemporaries at the Spaso House event.

Sokolov's conclusions were contested by candidate of philological sciences Lidiya Yanovskaya. She criticized, in particular, the identification of Nikolai Ivanovich with Nikolai Bukharin based on an alleged "clothing similarity". Much of the information in Sokolov's book, in her view, demonstrates the researcher's erudition but is irrelevant to Bulgakov and lacks convincing argumentation. She also disputed the claimed clothing similarity between the character and prototype. Elena Bulgakova noted that Bukharin wore a frock coat (which implies sleeves) at the reception, while Nikolai Ivanovich in the novel wears a vest (which lacks sleeves). In fact, the identification of Nikolai Bukharin with Nikolai Ivanovich was first established not by Sokolov but earlier by Doctor of Philology Boris Gasparov in his essay Observations on the Motivic Structure of M.A. Bulgakov's The Master and Margarita. It was first published as an academic article (Slavica Hierosolymitana, III, Jerusalem, 1978) and later included in the collection Literary Leitmotifs: Essays on 20th-Century Russian Literature*, published by Nauka in 1993.

Doctor of Philology Marietta Chudakova also confirmed that impressions from the Spaso House event influenced Satan's Ball. In her view, the novel's ballroom with columns of "sparkling yellowish stone," "walls" of white tulips and Japanese camellias, red, pink, and white roses, "white bosoms and black shoulders of tailcoats," "champagne bubbling in three pools," an impressive carpeted staircase, and the presence of parrots, chimpanzees, and polar bears "playing harmonicas and dancing Kamarinskaya" are tied to the Spring Festival. This perspective is shared by the authors of The Novel the Master and Margarita by M. Bulgakov: A Commentary, Doctor of Philology Irina Belobrovtseva and Doctor of Philosophy Svetlana Kulyus. They identify Bullitt as one of Woland's prototypes, Boris Shteiger as Baron Meigel's prototype, and the phrase "tailcoat or black jacket" as originating from the Bulgakovs' Spring Festival invitation. They also note other novel details reflecting the event.

Candidate of historical sciences Evgenia Pyadysheva called the influence of the April 1935 Spaso House reception on The Master and Margarita a "fascinating urban legend." In her 2012 article Nikolai Vtorov's Estate in Spasopeskovsky Lane, she details the history and interiors of the ambassador's residence but uses terminology (Great Hall, rectangular and oval living rooms) that does not align with the names used by Thayer and Wiley (dining room, ballroom).

Candidate of historical sciences Vera Raikova presented a paper titled the Great Ball at Satan's in The Master and Margarita and the American Embassy (Note: In many publications, including Raikova's paper, Spaso House is referred to as the American Embassy. In reality, in 1935, the embassy was located at 13 Mokhovaya Street. Spaso House was then (and remains) the personal residence of the U.S. Ambassador.) in Moscow: A Historical-Literary Analysis" at the Interdisciplinary Seminar on the History of Cultural Mutual Perception "Russia and the World." Her conclusion: "A comparative analysis of Bulgakov's novel The Master and Margarita and historical accounts (correspondence between Ambassador W. Bullitt and President F.D. Roosevelt, memoirs of American diplomats C. Thayer, C. Bohlen, J. Kennan, Elena Bulgakova's diary, etc.) suggests that the lavish reception at Spaso House served as the prototype for one of the novel's key scenes—the Great Ball at Satan's".

Doctor of Philology Lyudmila Saraskina in her 2018 book Literary Classics in the Temptation of Adaptations: A Century of Transformations noted that the establishment of Soviet power eliminated balls from literary works, as the classes that initiated such events were destroyed during the class struggle. Thus, the ball organized by Bullitt during the Spring Festival provided unique material for Bulgakov's novel. Saraskina claims the festival was timed to celebrate the anniversary of the United States' recognition of the Soviet Union. (Note: Another theory was proposed by Marietta Chudakova in her 2013 book on The Master and Margarita. She claimed the April 1935 reception celebrated Easter.) In the novel, the ball became the culmination of the plot—the heroine renounced her human nature, willingly underwent a satanic ritual ("allowed herself to be washed in human blood," "drank the blood of a man killed before her from Satan's chalice"), and consciously gave her life to Satan for the sake of her beloved.

== Historiography ==
=== References ===
William Bullitt described the Spring Festival in a letter dated May 1, 1935, to President Franklin D. Roosevelt:

The Russians still dare to come to my house for large entertainments when there can be no possibility of private conversation. There was a good turnout for the ball I gave on the 23rd of April. Litvinov came with his wife and eldest daughter. It was an astonishingly successful party, thoroughly dignified yet gay. Everyone happy and no one drunk. In fact, if I can believe the letter I got from the British Ambassadress and many verbal messages, it was the best party in Moscow since the revolution. We got a thousand tulips from Helsingfors and forced a lot of birch trees into premature leafage and arranged one end of the dining room as a collective farm with peasant accordion players, dancers, and all sorts of baby things, such as birds, goats, and a couple of infant bears about the size of cats. We also had pleasant lighting effects done by the best theater here and a bit of a cabaret. It was really great fun and the Turkish Ambassador and about twenty others remained until breakfast at eight…

The Spring Festival and its preparation process are described in detail in the memoirs of Charles Thayer, an employee of the American embassy in the 1930s, titled Bears in Caviar, published in 1951, and translated into Russian in 2016. Another detailed account of the festival's preparation and celebration is included in the memoirs Around the World at 20 Years, published in English in 1962, by Irena Wiley, the wife of an American diplomat, sculptor, and painter. A brief fragment on the ball and its preparation is provided by Mikhail Bulgakov in Elena Bulgakova's Diary, first published in 1990, and later republished in 2004.

=== Russian and foreign historiography ===
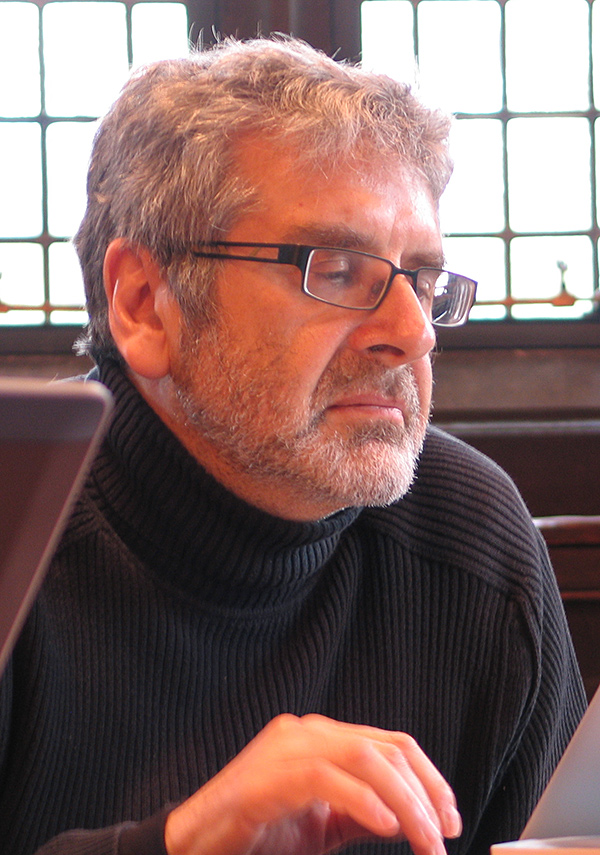
Alexander Etkind in 2014

Doctor of Philosophy in Slavic Philology and Candidate of Psychological Sciences Alexander Etkind dedicated a chapter to the Spring Festival of April 1935 as a prototype for the Great Ball at Satan's in two of his books: Eros of the Impossible: The History of Psychoanalysis in Russia (1994) and The World Could Have Been Different: William Bullitt in Attempts to Change the 20th Century (2015), as well as in the second edition of the book Interpretation of Travels: Russia and America in Travelogues and Intertexts (2022). Doctor of Philosophy Sean Guillory, in a review published in the journal Bookforum of the memoirs of the American ambassador to Russia Michael McFaul and Alexander Etkind's monograph on William Bullitt's fate in English translation, analyzes the private and social life of American diplomats in Moscow in the 1930s, particularly highlighting the party held on April 24. The researcher draws attention to the term used by Etkind in relation to Bullitt's activities in the USSR capital — "theater of diplomacy." Guillory himself characterized the embassy's life at that time as a "diplomatic Disneyland, when collectivization, famine, and terror consumed the lives of millions of Soviet people".

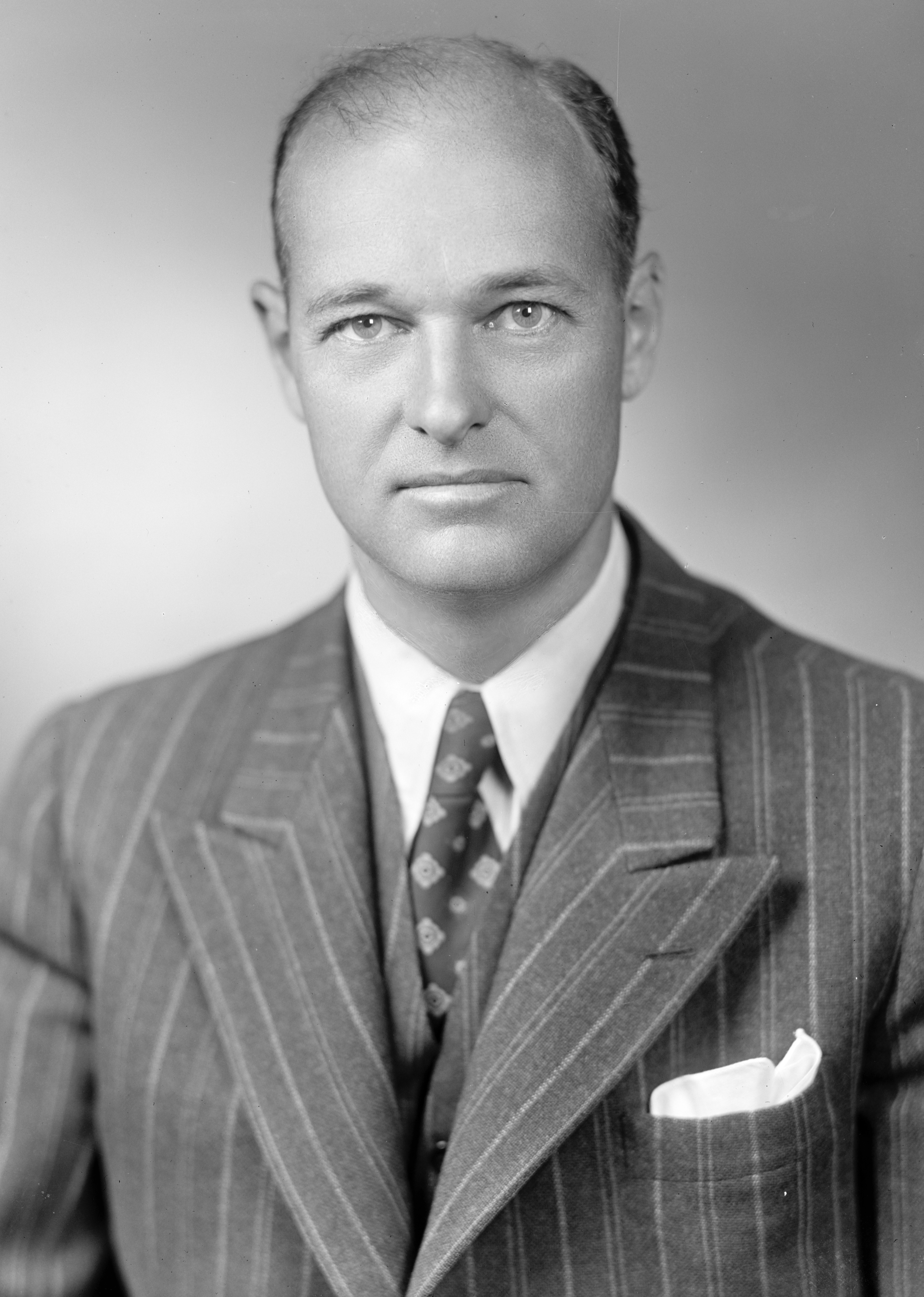
George F. Kennan in 1947

Doctor of Philological Sciences Aleksey Varlamov in his biography of Bulgakov, published in 2008 in the series the Lives of Remarkable People, like Etkind, is cautious in assessing the influence of the Spring Festival on the writer's novel—he recognized the festival only as the "culmination" of Bulgakov's meetings with American embassy staff.

One of the founders of the Bulgakov House in Moscow, Bulgakov scholar Leonid Parshin involved in his research on the festival events in his book Devilry at the American Embassy in Moscow, or 13 Mysteries of Mikhail Bulgakov (1991) articles from the American press (e.g., an article by diplomat and journalist Peter S. Bridges, Spaso House, published in The Foreign Service Journal in 1964) and written testimonies of festival contemporaries he requested. In particular, he contacted the U.S. Ambassador to the USSR in 1952–1953, George F. Kennan, who in 1935 was also in Moscow but as the first secretary of the embassy, asking him to provide information about the festival. "I myself did not attend it (I was ill at the time), but some of my good friends were there… I was told that for this very ball, a whole zoo of various birds and animals, including a bear, was gathered —for amusement— and it is very likely that there were parrots among them. It should be added that this was the only ball of its kind in Moscow during those years. Nothing like it was ever repeated," Kennan wrote in response.

Contemporary Russian literary scholar Boris Sokolov devoted a section to the relationship between the Satan's Ball in Bulgakov's novel and the Spring Festival at Spaso House in the chapter Great Ball at Satan's: The Procession of Great Villains in his book Mikhail Bulgakov: Mysteries of Creativity published in 2008, and almost verbatim repeated this chapter under the same title in the book The Master and the Demons of Fate published eight years later. The same information was published by Sokolov in 2016 in the book Deciphered Bulgakov: Secrets of The Master and Margarita. Much earlier (in 1996), the article Great Ball at Satan's appeared in Sokolov's Bulgakov Encyclopedia.

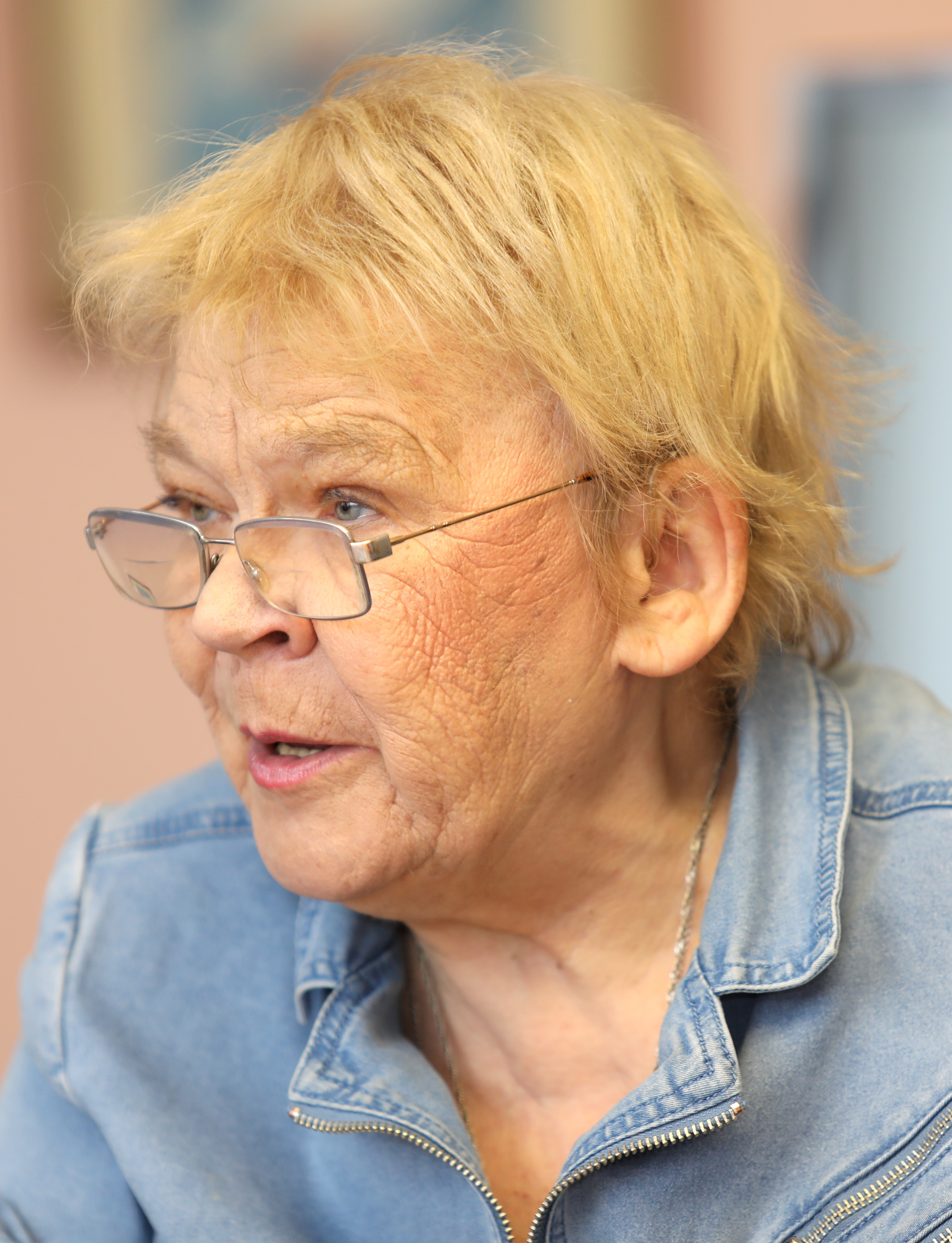
Marietta Chudakova in 2017

The presence of impressions from the festival at the American ambassador's residence in the Satan's Ball was noted by Doctor of Philological Sciences Marietta Chudakova in the books The Last Book, or Voland's Triangle: With Digressions, Abridgments, Additions (2013) and Biography of Mikhail Bulgakov (2023), as well as by the authors of the book M. Bulgakov's Novel "The Master and Margarita": Commentary. This idea was also explored in a report by Candidate of Historical Sciences Vera Raykova, titled The 'Great Ball at Satan's' in the Novel 'The Master and Margarita' and the American Embassy in Moscow: A Historical-Literary Analysis.

The Spring Festival at Spaso House was given attention in the analysis of William Bullitt's role in the broader context of the development of relations between the two countries by Doctor of Philosophy in History Michael Cassella-Blackburn in the book The Donkey, the Carrot, and the Club: William C. Bullitt and Soviet-American Relations, 1917–1948 (2004).

Certain aspects of the role of the Spring Festival in the development of Soviet-American relations and its possible influence on Mikhail Bulgakov's work on the novel The Master and Margarita are addressed in the book by Lyudmila Saraskina, Literary Classics in the Temptation of Adaptations: A Century of Transformations (2018), in the book by Elizaveta Yanovskaya, The Last Book, or Voland's Triangle (2013), and in the article by Pavel Spivakovsky, The Baron's Blood in 'The Master and Margarita' (Bulgakov's Novel as an 'Anti-Soviet' Work) (2020).

Former advisor to the American government, Doctor of Philosophy specializing in international relations issues, Paul M. Cole, in the first volume of his two-volume monograph of 2018, Reporting POW / MIA, provides a detailed description of the reception on April 24, 1935, relying on Charles Thayer's memoirs. The conclusion he draws: "Throwing champagne and caviar at the Russian leopard didn't change its spots".

French political scientist and senior researcher at the Center for Social History of the 20th Century at University of Paris, Patrick Weil, in the book A Madman in the White House: Sigmund Freud, Ambassador Bullitt, and the Lost Psychobiography of Woodrow Wilson (2023), draws on additional sources related to the reactions of U.S. politicians and media to the evident success of the Spring Festival in Moscow. According to Weil, one of the goals of the party was to establish friendly personal relations between American diplomats and Soviet officials. Due to several factors, this goal was not achieved.

== In culture and contemporary politics ==
=== 21st-century politicians on the Spaso House Reception of April 24 ===
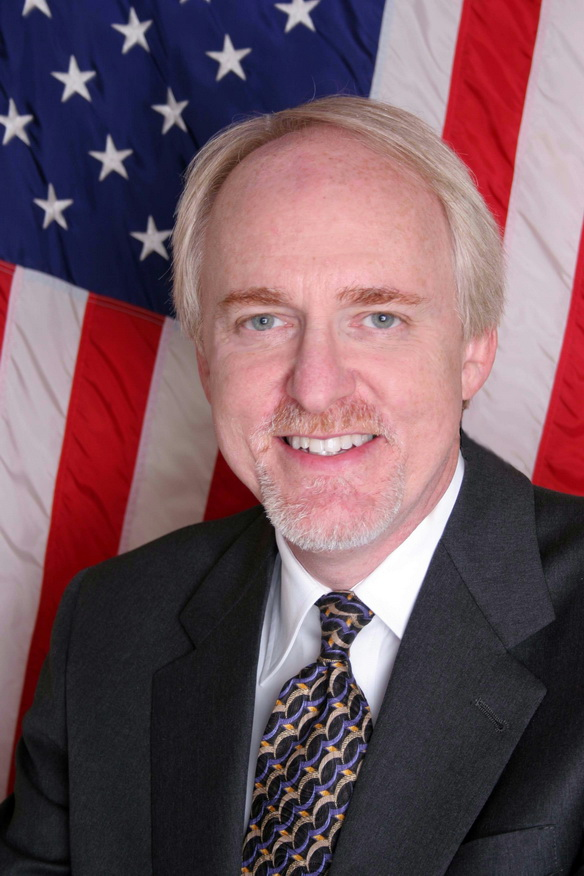
John Beyrle in 2008

External videos
- Russia 1: "Spectacular Ball" at Spaso House Hosted by U.S. Ambassador John Beyrle, October 29, 2008
- U.S. Embassy in Russia: Enchanted Ball. An American Take on the Ball from "The Master and Margarita"

On October 29, 2010, the American ambassador to Russia John Beyrle hosted a reception to "commemorate the 75th anniversary of the ball at Spaso House, which inspired Mikhail Bulgakov." According to Russian media reviews, the event was significantly more modest: instead of live birds, there were paper and fabric ones, and instead of a "pool of champagne" [not mentioned by the organizers or guests of the Spring Festival], there was a "small tabletop basin with a frothy stream." Unlike the 1935 ball, which required tuxedos or black jackets, guests were informed that military uniforms or 1930s-style clothing were preferred. Among the guests were banker Pyotr Aven, political scientist Gleb Pavlovsky, television and radio host Yulia Latynina, her father, literary scholar Leonid Latynin, and theater directors, People's Artists of the Russian Federation Svetlana Vragova and Mikhail Levitin. The guests largely ignored the organizers' clothing request. The only attendee in a 1930s marshal's uniform was Russian-born American billionaire Leonard Blavatnik.

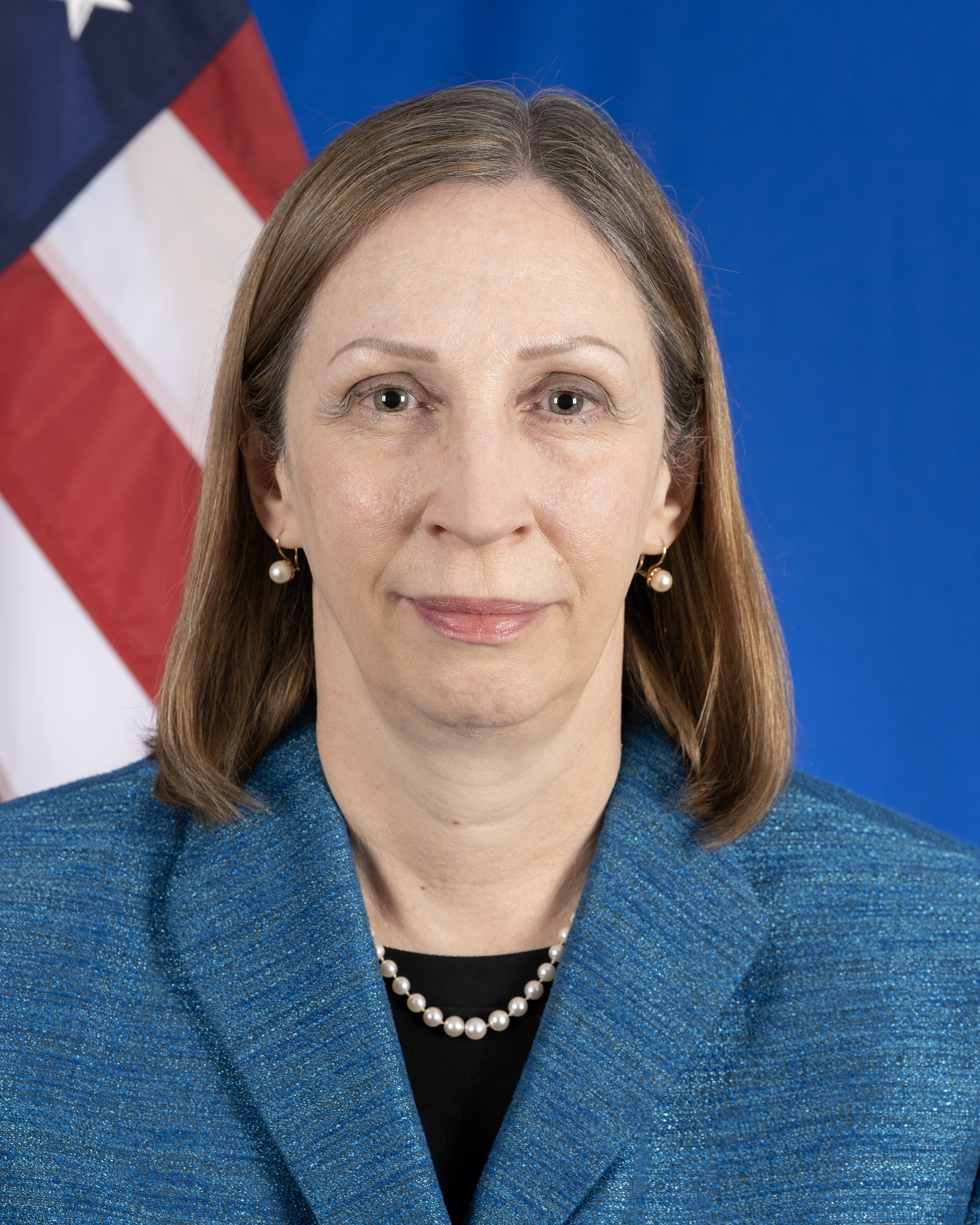
Lynne Tracy in 2023

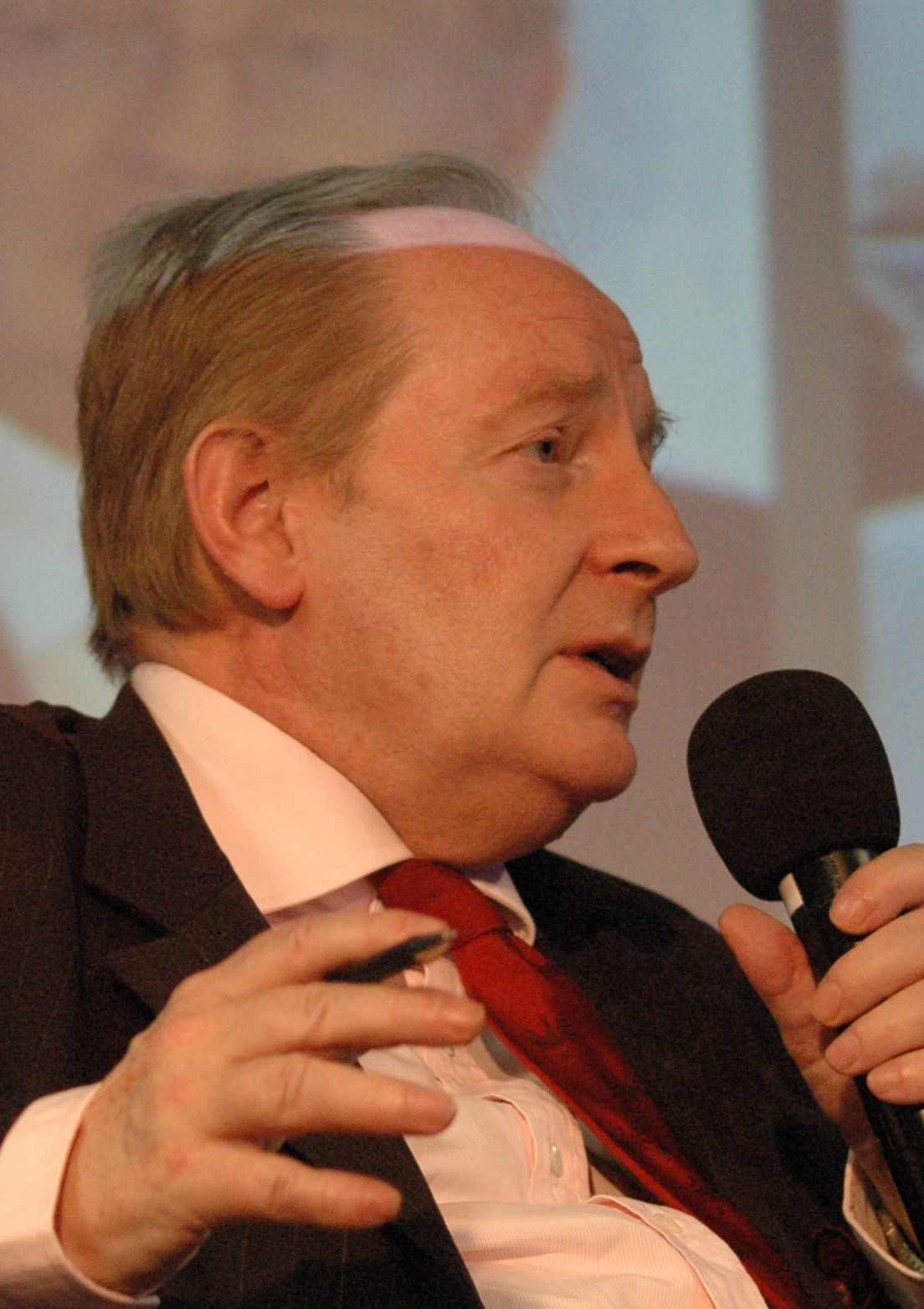
Yvan Blot in 2012

The official website of the U.S. Embassy in Moscow, in the section "75th Anniversary of Spaso House: A Brief History," recounts some episodes of the Spring Festival and assesses the significance of such ceremonial receptions in the development of Soviet-American relations: "Events like the 'Spring Festival' made an invaluable contribution to fostering personal relationships between American diplomats and their Soviet counterparts. Ambassador Bullitt used receptions at Spaso House as a means to build ties with Soviet officials (especially military ones) outside the People's Commissariat for Foreign Affairs, as he believed Commissar Litvinov was hostile to American interests".

Conservative French politician and co-founder of the analytical center "Crossroads of Hours," Yvan Blot, in his book Russia of Vladimir Putin, discussing Mikhail Bulgakov's novel, argued that the world of supernatural forces in The Master and Margarita represents a "modern and rational world based on law." It entices people with technological marvels, offers money, and uses emotions to create chaos. Korovyev, in his view, symbolizes finance, Hella —pop culture, and Behemoth the Cat— the American military. Voland, printing money and stocks, presenting himself as an expert capable of fixing the world, "resembles the hypocritical and generous Uncle Sam." To support this comparison, Blot notes that the novel's depiction of the satanic ball is based on the extravagant reception of April 24, 1935, at the residence of the American ambassador in Moscow.

Several Russian media outlets, including the online publication Life and the newspaper Komsomolskaya Pravda, reported in May 2024 that the official representative of the Ministry of Foreign Affairs of the Russian Federation, Candidate of Historical Sciences Maria Zakharova, commented on a statement by the U.S. Ambassador to the Russian Federation Lynne Tracy after her visit to the Mikhail Bulgakov Museum in Moscow. While in the foyer of her residence, the ambassador stated: "When guests come to Spaso House, one of the first things they see is this magnificent staircase, which many believe inspired Bulgakov's scene of the 'Spring Full Moon Ball'… Ambassador Bullitt understood what remains true today: Spaso House is a place where Americans and Russians can meet, where we jointly honor Russian culture, learn to understand each other better, and hope for a better future by maintaining these contacts between our two peoples." Zakharova noted that in Russia, this scene is called the "Ball at Satan's" and that Bulgakov actually wrote the scene of a hellish sabbath based on the April 23 ball, but "the staircase, doorman, and fireplace setting is described by Bulgakov as a portal to hell." She also called the Spaso House reception an infernal farce and a diabolical party with animals and goats, contrasting it with the Easter holiday—the true festival of spring.

The publication Life also claimed that Zakharova proposed including this information in textbooks for secondary schools and universities. (Note: In fact, the Spring Festival at Spaso House in connection with the Satan's Ball was already included in practice tasks for the Unified State Exam in English in November 2022 (Variant AYa2210101). In task No. 10, "Match texts A–G with headings 1–8," two of the eight texts (F and G) were dedicated to the festival. One recounts the history of the building and briefly mentions the reception held on April 24, 1935. The other describes the festival in detail and notes that it served as the basis for the ball in Bulgakov's novel.) She also stated that during her youth, the ball and Voland were mistakenly associated with Soviet realities, but in fact, it was a description of impressions from the festival at the U.S. ambassador's residence. A full audio recording of Zakharova's speech was published on Radio Sputnik.

=== Media and journalism ===
Doctor of Juridical Sciences Lev Simkin, who specializes in historical investigations in his books for a broad audience, describes the Spaso House reception in the chapter The Red Baron in his book The Great Deception: Foreigners in the Land of Bolsheviks (2022). Member of the Russian Writers' Union, director of the Saint Petersburg "Writers' House" Vladimir Malyshev dedicated a chapter, "Reception at Spaso House," to the events of April 23, 1935, in his book Myths and Mysteries of Our History (2015). The author places particular emphasis on the debauchery and carelessness of the revelry—at the American ambassador's residence, "executioners and their future victims drank and danced together".

Russian media have repeatedly published articles on the preparation and conduct of the Spring Festival. Some include details not mentioned in the primary sources used by researchers to reconstruct the event. The newspaper Arguments and Facts in the article Spaso House: How the Mansion of the Russian Morgan Became 'America on Arbat' (2017) describes the Spring Festival in detail, mentioning "fountains of champagne and wine" not noted in the memoirs of Wiley, Thayer, or Bulgakova. The magazine Salon-interior mentions an "abundance of exotic food" at the Spring Festival, again not noted by any memoirists of the Spaso House reception. The Russian sociopolitical online publication Gazeta.Ru published an article in 2018 by Alexandra Balandina titled Bears in Caviar': The Satan's Ball at the American Embassy. It describes the preparation process and the festival itself, noting that William Bullitt, together with American writer F. Scott Fitzgerald, organized parties in the style of The Great Gatsby in France.

An article titled Goats, Birds, and a Vomiting Bear: How the American Embassy Partied in 1935 was published in December 2022 in English on the website of the Russian multimedia project ANO "TV-Novosti," Russia Beyond.

Event specialist and collector Suzette Field in her book A Curious Invitation: The Forty Greatest Parties in Fiction (2013) dedicated an entire chapter to analyzing the Great Ball of Voland. She identifies the Spring Festival at Spaso House as the model for this ball. Field concludes that since "Soviet propagandists had already demonized America, Bullitt's party of decadence and excess did no favors for his country's reputation". Journalism professor at Boston University, Peter Rand in his book Conspiracy of One: The Secret Plot of Tyler Kent Against Franklin Delano Roosevelt, Winston Churchill, and the Allied War Effort (2013), wrote that Charles Thayer's role (with William Bullitt's full approval) at the embassy was to organize entertainment at Spaso House, and as an illustration, he describes in detail two parties organized by Thayer—Christmas celebrations and the Spring Festival. Roy Peterson served as an assistant military attaché in Moscow during the height of the Cold War from 1983 to 1985. His documentary-adventure novel Iron Badge, published in 2011, includes a description of Spaso House's history, its transfer to the American diplomatic mission, its exterior and interior, and the April 24, 1935, party, mentioning eyewitnesses who left memoirs about it (Charles Thayer, Irena Wiley, and Elena Bulgakova).

A detailed description of the events of April 24, 1935, at William Bullitt's personal residence is included in the book "Spaso House": People and Encounters: Notes of an American Ambassador's Wife (2004) by professional photographer and wife of the U.S. Ambassador to the USSR from 1987 to 1991, Jack Matlock, Rebecca Matlock. Matlock gives a low assessment of Charles Thayer: "an enterprising young American hired as auxiliary labor". The author mistakenly attributes the Spring Festival to 1934 instead of 1935 several times. Matlock also misquotes Bullitt's letter to Roosevelt dated May 1, 1935. She claims the letter states: "twenty guests remained for breakfast, and it was very successful, so one of them even got drunk!" In reality, the original text after "about twenty remained for breakfast at eight" includes an ellipsis, and the phrase about drunkenness appears earlier in the letter in the negative: "no one [was] drunk".

The book by the wife of the U.S. Ambassador to the Russian Federation from 1997 to 2001, James Franklin Collins, Doctor of Philosophy Naomi F. Collins, Through Dark Days and White Nights: Four Decades Observing a Changing Russia (2007), is an eyewitness account of Russia from the mid-1960s, when she was a graduate student at Moscow State University, to the early 21st century. The book is a collection of reflections and impressions of an American living in Moscow during such different eras. In one episode, while at Spaso House, Naomi Collins recalls the Spring Festival events and muses: "how unimaginable such a spectacle would be today! (Imagine the headlines from the Inspector General's report published in The Washington Post…)".

== Bibliography ==
=== Sources ===
- Bulgakova, E. (1990). Loseva, V. I.; Yanovskaya, L. M. (eds.). Дневник Елены Булгаковой [Elena Bulgakova's Diary]. Из рукописного наследия (in Russian). Москва: Книжная палата. ISBN 5-7000-0179-9.
- Bulgakova, E. (2004). "«Роман нужно окончить…» Дневник Е. С. Булгаковой и письма М. А. Булгакова" ["The novel must be finished..." Ye. S. Bulgakova's Diary and M. A. Bulgakov's Letters]. In Loseva, V. I. (ed.). Михаил и Елена Булгаковы. Дневник Мастера и Маргариты [Mikhail and Elena Bulgakov. Diary of the Master and Margarita]. Литературные мемуары (in Russian). Москва: Вагриус. pp. 127–466.
- Thayer, Charles W. (2016). "VII. Морские львы на кухне / XI. Медведи в бальном зале" [VII. Seals in the Kitchen / XI. Bears in the Ballroom]. Медведи в икре [Bears in the Caviar] (in Russian). Москва: Весь мир. pp. 122–132 / 173–185. ISBN 978-5-7777-0635-5.
- Thayer, Charles W. (1951). "VII. Seals in the Kitchen / XI. Bears in the Ballroom". Bears in the Caviar. New York, Philadelphia: J. B. Lippincott & Co. pp. 106–114 / 154–164. ISBN 978-5-9691-1348-0.
- Wiley, Irena (1962). "[Описание Фестиваля весны]" [[Description of the Spring Festival]]. Around the Globe in 20 Years. Philadelphia, Pennsylvania: David McKay Publications. pp. 31–35.
- "William C. Bullitt for Franklin D. Roosevelt. Personal and Confidential. May 1, Moscow, 1935". For the President, Personal and Secret; Correspondence Between Franklin D. Roosevelt and William C. Bullitt. Boston: Houghton Mifflin Harcourt. 1972. pp. 115–117. ISBN 0-3951-3997-X.

=== Researches and non-fiction ===
- Varlamov, A. N. (2008). "Фигура умолчания" [The Figure of Silence]. Михаил Булгаков [Mikhail Bulgakov]. Жизнь замечательных людей, Т. 1139 (in Russian). Москва: Молодая гвардия. pp. 576–606. ISBN 978-5-2350-3132-6.
- Gasparov, B. M. (1993). "Из наблюдений над мотивной структурой романа М. А. Булгакова «Мастер и Маргарита»" [From Observations on the Motif Structure of M. A. Bulgakov's Novel "The Master and Margarita"]. Литературные лейтмотивы. Очерки по русской литературе XX века [Literary Leitmotifs. Essays on 20th Century Russian Literature] (in Russian). Москва: Наука, Восточная литература. pp. 28–82. ISBN 5-0201-7721-0.
- Parshin, L. K. (1991). "Чертовщина в Американском посольстве в Москве" [Devilry at the American Embassy in Moscow]. Чертовщина в Американском посольстве в Москве, или 13 загадок Михаила Булгакова [Devilry at the American Embassy in Moscow, or 13 Mysteries of Mikhail Bulgakov]. Популярная библиотека (in Russian). Москва: Книжная палата. pp. 114–127. ISBN 5-7000-0299-X.
- Pyadysheva, Ye. B. (2012). "Усадьба Второва в Спасопесковском переулке" [Vtorov's Estate in Spasopeskovsky Lane] (PDF). Международная жизнь (in Russian) (6). Москва: Министерство иностранных дел Российской Федерации: 177–182. ISSN 0130-9625.
- Saraskina, L. I. (2018). "XI". Литературная классика в соблазне экранизаций. Столетие перевоплощений [Literary Classics in the Temptation of Screen Adaptations. A Century of Transformations] (in Russian). Москва: Прогресс-Традиция. pp. 537–539. ISBN 978-5-8982-6514-4.
- Sokolov, B. V. (2008). "Великий бал у сатаны: шествие великих злодеев" [The Great Ball at Satan's: The Procession of Great Villains]. Михаил Булгаков: загадки творчества [Mikhail Bulgakov: Mysteries of Creativity] (in Russian). Москва: Вагриус. pp. 441–495. ISBN 978-5-9697-0626-2.
- Sokolov, B. V. (2016). "Великий бал у сатаны: шествие великих злодеев" [The Great Ball at Satan's: The Procession of Great Villains]. Мастер и демоны судьбы [The Master and the Demons of Fate]. Булгаков. 125 лет Мастеру (in Russian). Москва: Яуза, Эксмо. ISBN 978-5-6998-7443-9.
- Spivakovsky, P. Ye. (2020). "Кровь барона в « Pulitzer Prize-winning «Мастере и Маргарите» (булгаковский роман как «антисоветское» произведение)" [The Baron's Blood in "The Master and Margarita" (Bulgakov's Novel as an "Anti-Soviet" Work)]. In Bogdanova, O. V. (ed.). Роман М. Булгакова «Мастер и Маргарита»: ди dialogue с современностью [M. Bulgakov's Novel "The Master and Margarita": A Dialogue with Modernity]. М. А. Булгаков: pro et contra. История и современное отношение к наследию Михаила Булгакова (in Russian). Санкт-Петербург: Русская христианская гуманитарная академия. pp. 406–420. ISBN 978-5-9073-0915-9.
- Chudakova, M. O. (2013). Последняя книга или Треугольник Воланда. С отступлениями, сокращениями, дополнениями [The Last Book or Woland's Triangle. With Digressions, Omissions, and Additions] (in Russian). Москва: ПРОЗАиК. ISBN 978-5-9163-1189-1.
- Chudakova, M. O. (2023). "Глава пятая. Возвращение к роману. Новые пьесы и надежды (1932–1935)" [Chapter Five. Return to the Novel. New Plays and Hopes (1932–1935)]. Жизнеописание Михаила Булгакова [Biography of Mikhail Bulgakov]. Биографии, автобиографии, мемуары (in Russian). Москва: КоЛибри, Азбука-Аттикус. pp. 497–597. ISBN 978-5-3892-2034-8.
- Etkind, A. M. (2015). "Глава 9. Московские развлечения" [Chapter 9. Moscow Entertainments]. Мир мог быть другим. Уильям Буллит в попытках изменить XX век [The World Could Have Been Different. William Bullitt in Attempts to Change the 20th Century]. Диалог (in Russian). Москва: Время. pp. 155–181. ISBN 978-5-9691-1348-0.
- Etkind, A. M. (1994). "Посол и сатана: Уильям К. Буллит в булгаковской Москве" [The Ambassador and Satan: William C. Bullitt in Bulgakov's Moscow]. Эрос невозможного. История психоанализа в России [Eros of the Impossible. The History of Psychoanalysis in Russia] (in Russian). Москва: Гнозис, Прогресс-Комплекс. pp. 272–298. ISBN 5-7333-0446-4.
- Etkind, A. M. (2022). "Чего не знала Маргарита" [What Margarita Did Not Know]. Толкование путешествий: Россия и Америка в травелогах и интертекстах [Interpretation of Travels: Russia and America in Travelogues and Intertexts] (in Russian). Москва: Новое литературное обозрение. pp. 293–296. ISBN 978-5-4448-1859-6.
- Yanovskaya, L. M. (2013). Последняя книга, или Треугольник Воланда [The Last Book, or Woland's Triangle] (in Russian). Москва: ПРОЗАиК. ISBN 978-5-91631-189-1.
- Cassella-Blackburn, Michael (2004). "7. Fear and Loathing in Moscow". The Donkey, the Carrot, and the Club: William C. Bullitt and Soviet-American Relations, 1917—1948. Westport, Connecticut; London: Praeger Publisher. pp. 147–176. ISBN 0-2759-6820-0.
- Cole, Paul M. (2018). ""Evil Creeps," Conspiracy Theorists, and DPMO's Activities". POW / MIA Accounting. New York: Harper Perennial. pp. 733–812尖. ISBN 978-9-8110-7127-0.
- Guillory, Sean (2018). "Our Men in Moscow. Two New Books Offer Contrasting Pictures of American Ambassadors to Russia". Bookforum. Sankara, Bhaskar. ISSN 1098-3376.
- Weil, Patrick (2023). "Ambassador Bullitt Goes to Moscow". The Madman in the White House: Sigmund Freud, Ambassador Bullitt, and the Lost Psychobiography of Woodrow Wilson. Cambridge, Massachusetts: Harvard University Press. pp. 143–159. ISBN 978-0-6742-9161-4.

=== Journalism and Fiction ===
- Blot, Yvan (2016). "Булгаков, мастер фантасмагории" [Bulgakov, Master of Phantasmagoria]. Россия Путина [Putin's Russia] (in Russian). Translated by Ogordov, M. K. Москва: Книжный мир. ISBN 978-5-8041-0843-5.
- Zakharova, M. V. (2024). "Портал в преисподнюю в Спасо-хаус" [Portal to the Underworld at Spaso House]. Комсомольская правда (in Russian). ISSN 0233-433X.
- Konstantinova, T. (2003). "Спасо-хаус. Разнообразные архитектурные истоки в одном необычайно выразительном произведении — особняке на Арбате" [Spaso House. Diverse Architectural Origins in One Remarkably Expressive Work — the Mansion on Arbat]. Salon-interior (in Russian). 1 (68). АО «Бренд Комьюнити Медиа».
- Malyshev, V. V. (2015). "Приём в Спасо-Хаусе" [Reception at Spaso House]. Мифы и загадки нашей истории [Myths and Mysteries of Our History] (in Russian). Санкт-Петербург: Алетейя. pp. 57–81. ISBN 978-5-9067-0563-1.
- Matlock, Rebecca (2004). "Как Будённый с Ворошиловым исполняли русские пляски" [How Budyonny and Voroshilov Performed Russian Dances]. «Спасо-Хаус». Люди и встречи: записки жены американского посла ["Spaso House". People and Encounters: Notes of an American Ambassador's Wife] (in Russian). Translated by Kudryavtseva, T. Москва: Эксмо. pp. 139–153. ISBN 5-6990-5497-9.
- Matlock, Rebecca (2020). "Chapter 4. Soviet Guests". At Spaso House. Bloomington: AuthorHouse. ISBN 978-1-6655-0452-2.
- Sidorchik, A. (2017). "Спасо-Хаус. Как особняк «русского Моргана» стал «Америкой на Арбате»" [Spaso House. How the "Russian Morgan's" Mansion Became "America on Arbat"]. Аргументы и факты (in Russian). АО «Аргументы и факты». ISSN 0204-0476.
- Simkin, L. S. (2022). "Красный барон" [The Red Baron]. Великий обман. Чужестранцы в стране большевиков [The Great Deception. Foreigners in the Land of the Bolsheviks]. История с Львом Симкиным (in Russian). Москва: Эксмо. pp. 272–280. ISBN 978-5-0415-6465-0.
- Field, Suzette (2013). "Satan's Rout. The Master and Margarita by Mikhail Bulgakov". A Curious Invitation: The Forty Greatest Parties in Fiction. New York: Harper Perennial. pp. 120–126. ISBN 978-0-0622-7183-9.
- Collins, Naomi F. (2007). "4. Witnessing the Century's Close: Russia Re-emerging". Through Dark Days and White Nights: Four Decades Observing a Changing Russia. Washington: Nap / Scarith. ISBN 978-0-9800-8140-4.
- Peterson, Roy E. (2011). "22. Shot At and Missed — by a Day". Iron Ikon: U.S. Foreign Commercial Office Duty in the Russian Far East. Authorhouse. pp. 149–152. ISBN 978-1-4634-1507-5.
- Rand, Peter (2013). "Two: Bad Hat". Conspiracy of One: Tyler Kent's Secret Plot Against FDR, Churchill, and the Allied War Effort. Guilford, Connecticut: Lyons Press. pp. 17–34. ISBN 978-0-7627-8696-1.

=== Reference Works and Encyclopedias ===
- Belobrovtseva, I. Z.; Kulyus, S. K. (2007). Роман М. Булгакова «Мастер и Маргарита». Комментарий [M. Bulgakov's Novel "The Master and Margarita". Commentary] (in Russian). Москва: Книжный клуб. ISBN 978-5-9869-7059-2.
- Ivanyan, E. A. (2001). "Буллит, Уильям Кристиан" [Bullitt, William Christian]. Энциклопедия российско-американских отношений. XVIII—XX века [Encyclopedia of Russian-American Relations. 18th–20th Centuries] (in Russian). Москва: Международные отношения. pp. 154–164. ISBN 5-7133-1045-0.
- Mednikova, E. M.; Apresyan, Yu. D. (1993). "housebreak". Новый большой англо-русский словарь [New Large English-Russian Dictionary] (in Russian). Vol. 2. Москва: Русский язык. p. 181. ISBN 5-2000-1849-8.
- Sokolov, B. V. (1996). "Великий бал у сатаны" [The Great Ball at Satan's]. Булгаковская энциклопедия [Bulgakov Encyclopedia] (in Russian). Москва: Миф. pp. 139–153. ISBN 978-5-9697-0626-2.
