= Mikhail Bulgakov bibliography =

The following is a bibliography of the works of Mikhail Bulgakov.

== Bibliography in English ==
In chronological order of translation

=== Novels ===
- The Master and Margarita
  - translated by Mirra Ginsburg, New York: Grove Press, 1967, 1995. London: Picador, 1989.
  - translated by Michael Glenny, London: Harvill, 1967; New York: Harper & Row, 1967; with introduction by Simon Franklin, New York: Knopf, 1992; London: Everyman's Library, 1992.
  - translated by Diana Burgin and Katherine O'Connor, annotations and afterword by Ellendea Proffer, Ann Arbor: Ardis, 1993, 1995.
  - translated by Richard Pevear and Larissa Volokhonsky, London: Penguin, 1997; London: Folio Society, 2010 with Introduction by Orlando Figes.
  - translated by Michael Karpelson, Lulu Press, 2006; Wordsworth Classics 2011. ISBN 1-84022-657-9
  - translated by Hugh Aplin, One World Classics, 2008. ISBN 978-1-84749-014-8
- Heart of a Dog, translated by Mirra Ginsburg, New York: Grove Press, 1968; London: Picador, 1990. ISBN 0-330-30739-8
- The White Guard (or White Guard)
  - translated by Michael Glenny, London, HarperCollins/Havill, 1971; New York: McGraw-Hill 1971; London, Fontana 1973;
  - translated by Marian Schwartz, Introduction by Evgeny Dobrenko: Yale University Press, 2008. ISBN 978-0-300-15145-9
  - translated by Roger Cockrell. Richmond: Alma Classics, 2012
- Theatrical Novel (Notes of a Dead Man)
  - Black Snow: Theatrical Novel, translated by Michael Glenny, London: Hodder and Stoughton, 1967; London: Collins-Harvill, 1986, 1991, 1996.
  - A Dead Man's Memoir: A Theatrical Novel, translated by Andrew Bromfield. London: Penguin, 2007.
  - Black Snow, translated by Roger Cockrell. Richmond: Alma Books, 2014.

=== Short stories ===
- Great Soviet Short Stories, New Laurel edition, New York: Dell. 1962, 1990. Contains Adventures of Chichikov.
- Diaboliad and Other Stories
  - translated by Carl R. Proffer, edited by Ellendea and Carl Proffer, Indiana University Press, 1972; Ann Arbor: Ardis, 1990, 1993; with an introduction by Julie Curtis, London: Harvill, 1991;
  - translated by Hugh Aplin, plus notes and extra material. Richmond: Oneworld Classics, 2010. ISBN 978-1-84749153-4
- A Country Doctor's Notebook, translated by Michael Glenny, London: Collins-Harvill, 1975, 1990, 1995.
- The Terrible News: Russian stories from the years following the Revolution, London:Black Spring Press, 1990, 1991. Contains The Red crown.
- Notes on the Cuff & Other Stories, translated by Alison Rice, Ann Arbor: Ardis, 1991.
- The Fatal Eggs and Other Soviet Satire, 1918-1963, edited and translated by Mirra Ginsburg, London: Quartet, 1993.

=== Theater ===
- Batum, Ardis Publishers, 1977.
- The Early Plays of Mikhail Bulgakov, translated by Carl R. Proffer and Ellendea Proffer, Dana Point: Ardis Publishers, 1990, 1995.
- Peace Plays: Two, selected and introduced by D. Lowe, London: Methuen Drama, 1990. Contains Adam and Eve.
- Zoya's Apartment: A Tragic Farce in Three Acts, translated by Nicholas Saunders and Frank Dwyer, New York: Samuel French, 1991.
- Zoyka's Apartment (revised: adaptation of 1929 and 1935 texts), translated and adapted by Nicholas Saunders and Frank Dwyer, Smith and Kraus, 1996.
- Six Plays, translated by William Powell, Michael Glenny and Michael Earley, introduced by Lesley Milne, London: Methuen Drama, 1991, 1994 (includes bibliographical references). Contains The White Guard, Madame Zoyka, Flight, Molière (The Cabal of Hypocrites, Adam and Eve, The Last Days.

== Bibliography in Russian ==
The transliteration and the literal translation of the title is given in square brackets

=== Novels and short stories ===
- Записки на манжетах [Zapiski na manzhetakh, "Notes on The Cuffs"], short stories, "Nakanune", Moscow: 1922; "Vozrozhdenie", Moscow: 1923; "Rossija", Moscow: 1923; "Zvezda Vostoka", Taskent: 1973, n. 3. Translated in English with the title Notes on Cuffs.
- Белая гвардия [Belaya Gvardiya, "The White Guard"], novel, "Rossiya", Moscow: 1924-1925 [incomplete]; first complete edition in Izbrannaya proza ["Chosen Prose"], 1966. Translated with the title The White Guard.
- Дьяволиада [Diaboliada], short novel, Nedra almanac, issue 4, 1924; Nedra Publishers, Moscow: 1925; London: 1970.
- Собачье сердце ["Heart of a Dog"], 1925; edited with introduction and commentary by Avril Pyman, London: Bristol Classical, 1994 (Russian text with English critical apparatus). Translated with the title Heart of a Dog.
- Роковые яйца [Rokovye Yaytsa, "The Fatal eggs"], novel, Nedra almanac, VI, 1925; London: 1970. Translated with the title The Fatal Eggs. (In at least one Hesperus edition of The Fatal Eggs the preface writer gives away the ending in the preface.)
- Похождения Чичикова ["Chichikov's adventures"], 1925.
- Записки юного врача [Zapiski Yunogo Vracha, "Notes of a country doctor"], short stories, "Krasnaya Panorama" and "Meditsinsky Rabotnik", Moscow: 1925-1926.
- [Rasskazy], Moscow: 1926.
- Морфий [Morfij, "Morfine"], 1926.
- Жизнь господина де Мольера ["Life of Monsieur de Molière"], 1936.
- Театральный роман ["Theatrical novel"], unfinished novel written between 1936 and 1939, "Novy Mir" 1965. It has been translated into English as Black Snow, or the Theatrical Novel and as A Dead Man's Memoir (A Theatrical Novel).
- Мастер и Маргарита [Master i Margarita, "The Master and Margarita"], novel written between 1929 and 1939, first edition partially censored in "Moskva", Moscow, n. 11, 1966 and n. 1, 1967; first complete edition in Russian, Frankfurt: 1969. Translated with the title The Master and Margarita.

=== Theater ===
- Зойкина квартира, [Zoikina kvartira, "Zoya's apartment"], 1925. Contemporary satire.
- Дни Турбиных [Dni Turbinykh, The Days of the Turbins], first representation October 5, 1926. Published Moscow: 1965'; Letchworth (UK): 1970. Based on the novel The White Guard, describes one family's survival in Kiev during the Russian Civil War.
- Бег [Beg, "Flight"], 1926-1928. Translated with the title Flight. Satirizing the flight of White emigrants to the West.
- Багровый остров, 1927 (The Crimson Island)
- Кабала святош [Kabala svyatosh, The Cabal of Hypocrites/Molière], 1929. Molière's relations with Louis XIV's court.
- Адам и Ева [Adam i Eva, "Adam and Eve"], 1931.
- Блаженство ["Beatitude"], 1933-1934.
- Иван Васильевич ["Ivan Vasilyevich"], 1934-1935. Ivan the Terrible brought by a Time Machine to a crowded apartment in the 1930s Moscow, screen version: Ivan Vasilievich: back to the future.
- Дон Кихот [Don Kikhot, Don Quixote], 1937-1938.
- Пушкин [Puskin, "Pushkin"] or Последние дни [Poslednie Dni, "The last days"], 1940. The last days of the great Russian poet.
- Батум Batum. Translated as Batum. Joseph Stalin's early years in Batumi.

=== Anthologies, collected works and letters ===
- [P'esy, "Comedies"], Moscow: 1962.
- [Dramy i Komedii, "Dramas and comedies"], Moscow: 1965.
- [Izbrannaya proza, "Selected Prose"], Moscow: 1966.
- [Romany, "Novels"], Moscow: 1974.
- [Pis'ma, "Letters"], Moscow: Sovremennik, 1989.
