= Badhuistheater =

Coordinates: 52.359540°N 4.912805°E

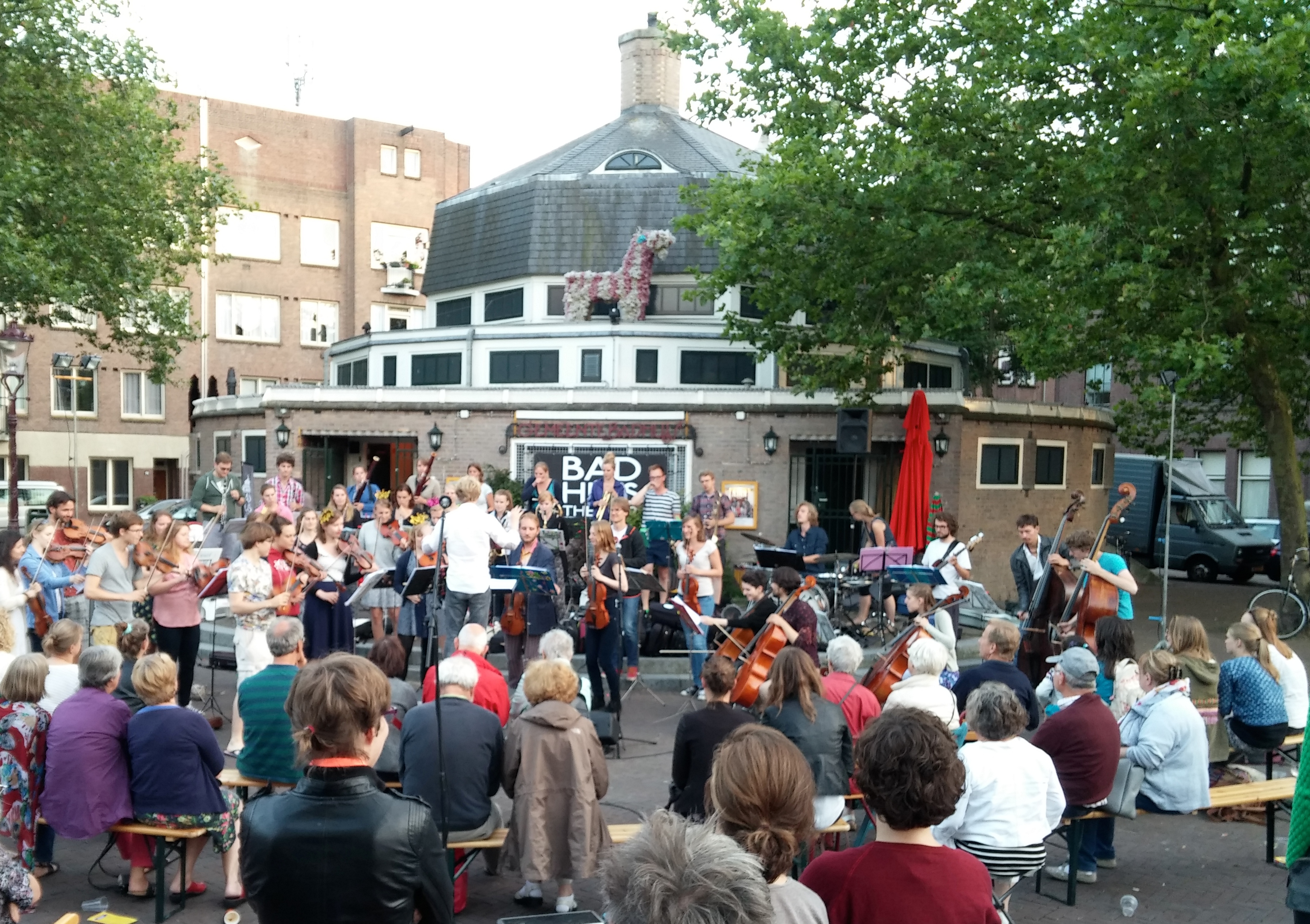
Open air concert in front of the Badhuistheater

The Badhuistheater (Dutch: Bath house theatre) is a theater venue located in a former bath house on the east-side of Amsterdam.

The theater is both a cultural meeting point for locals and a stage for international theatre productions. The theater is run by British actor and writer Michael Manicardi who acquired the neglected bath house around 1985 and transformed it into a theater. As a theater it seats between 50 and 120 people, depending on the chosen configuration.

== History ==
Designed by renowned architect Arend Jan Westerman, the building has a distinct circular shape around a central chimney. It was the first free standing communal bath house, built in 1913 for this purpose. Its architecture is in the distinct “Amsterdamse school” style. The building is a Dutch National monument.)

Since 2005 the Badhuistheater has its own theater-company: The Badhuis International Theatre. On a regular basis they bring new productions to the theater which they also bring to international festivals and other venues. Between 2015-2016 they produced the Sean O'Casey Dublin Trilogy (The Shadow of a Gunman, Juno and the Paycock, The Plough and the Stars). Later they staged classic British comedies 'Allo 'Allo and Blackadder, and The Good Soldier Svejk after the books by Jaroslav Hašek. More recent productions have included The Playgirl of the Western World (an adaptation of J.M Synge's The Playboy of the Western World), an adaptation of Brendan Behan's novel The Scarperer, More War, a street theater piece written to commemorate the liberation of the Netherlands, and Bulgakov's Revenge, adapted from the novel Black Snow by Mikhail Bulgakov.

The Badhuistheater provides a stage for many amateur and professional groups, mainly based in the Netherlands but occasionally international groups too. Musicals, spoken word, improv, Shakespeare and modern theater all feature regularly
