= Theatrical Novel =

Unfinished novel by Mikhail Bulgakov

Black Snow: A Theatrical Novel
- First English edition
- Author: Mikhail Bulgakov
- Language: Russian
- Genre: Theatre-fiction, semi-autobiographical novel, satirical novel
- Publisher: Novyy Mir
- Publication date: 1965

Theatrical Novel (Notes of a Dead Man), translated as Black Snow and A Dead Man's Memoir (Russian: Театральный роман (Записки покойника), romanized: Teatralnyy roman (Zapiski pokoynika) is an unfinished novel by Mikhail Bulgakov. Written in first-person, on behalf of a writer Sergei Maksudov, the novel tells of the behind-the-scenes drama of a theatre production and the Soviet writers' world.

== Background ==
In 1929, Bulgakov started working on a novella, written in the form of letters, called For Secret Friend (also unfinished), addressed to his future wife Elena Bulgakova, which explains how he "became a playwright". In 1930, For Secret Friend began to develop into a new novel, The Theatre, but in the same year he burned his initial sketches, along with rough drafts of The Master and Margarita.

Six years later and several weeks after the final break with Moscow Art Theatre, Bulgakov began writing a novel about the theatre. On the first page of the manuscript, he outlined two titles: Notes of a Dead Man and Theatrical Novel.

== Summary ==
The book satirizes the theatre director Konstantin Stanislavski through the character Ivan Vasilievich, whose methods hinder actors' performances, reflecting Bulgakov's frustration with Stanislavski whilst attempting to stage The Cabal of Hypocrites and The Days of the Turbins (which is mentioned in the novel as Black Snow) in 1930–1936. Black Snow could be considered theatre-fiction, which Graham Wolfe explains as "referring to novels and stories that engage in concrete and sustained ways with theatre as artistic practice and industry".

== English translations ==
- Black Snow: A Theatrical Novel, translated by Michael Glenny, Simon & Schuster, 1967. ISBN 0340023627.
- A Dead Man's Memoir: A Theatrical Novel, translated by Andrew Bromfield, Penguin Classics, 2007. ISBN 0140455140.
- Black Snow, translated by Roger Cockrell, Alma Books, 2014. ISBN 9781847493538.
