= Batum (disambiguation) =

Batum is a former name of Batumi, a seaside city on the Black Sea coast and capital of Adjara, an autonomous republic in southwest Georgia.

Batum may also refer to:

- Nicolas Batum, French professional basketball player
- Süheyl Batum, Turkish academic
- Batum (play), a play by Mikhail Bulgakov

== See also ==
- Treaty of Batum, a treaty signed by the Democratic Republic of Armenia and the Ottoman Empire
- Batam, a city in the Indonesian province of Riau Islands
