= The Fatal Eggs =

1925 novel by Mikhail Bulgakov

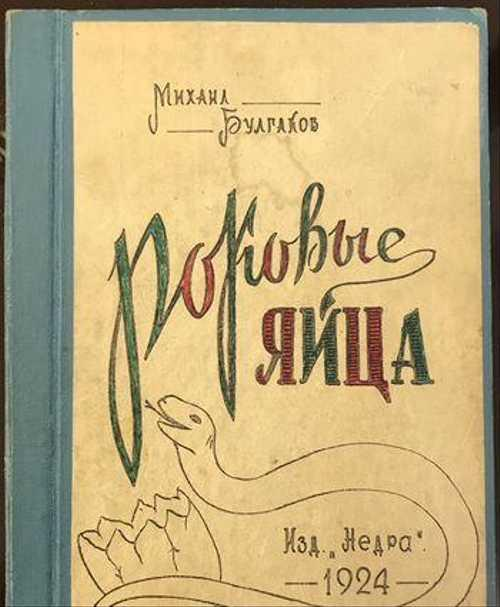
- Author: Mikhail Bulgakov
- Original title: Роковые яйца
- Language: Russian
- Genre: Science fiction, satire
- Publisher: Nedra Publishers
- Publication date: 1924
- Publication place: Russia
- Media type: Print (Hardback & Paperback)

The Fatal Eggs (Russian: Роковые яйца, pronounced [rəkɐˈvɨjə ˈjæjtsə]) (Note: The Russian title, Rokovye yaytsa, is a pun with the surname of the character, Rokk, who unleashed the disaster with the said eggs) is a novella by Soviet novelist and playwright Mikhail Bulgakov. It was written in 1924 and first published in 1924. The novel became quite popular, but was much criticised by most Soviet critics as a mockery of the Russian Revolution of 1917 and the leadership of Soviet Russia.

== Background ==
By 1924, Bulgakov was relatively well known as a writer. He had published several short stories, including Diaboliad, which was in some ways a precursor to his novel The Master and Margarita, and started publishing his first novel, The White Guard. He finished The Fatal Eggs in early October 1924 and published it by the Nedra Publishers in 1924 and included in the short-story collection Diaboliad in 1925. A shortened edition was published in May–June 1925 in the Krasnaya Panorama journal under the title The Ray of Life (Russian: Луч жизни). Bulgakov also read the novel on several occasions to various social gatherings, and it was received well.

== Plot summary ==
The Fatal Eggs can be described as a satirical science fiction novel. Its main protagonist is an aging zoologist and specialist in amphibians, Vladimir Ipatyevich Persikov. The narration begins in Moscow of the then-future year of 1928, which seems to have overcome the destructive effects of the Russian Civil War and to be quite prosperous. After a long period of degradation, research at the Zoological Institute has revived. After leaving his microscope for several hours, Persikov suddenly noticed that the out-of-focus microscope has produced a ray of red light since amoeba left under that light showed an impossibly-increased rate of binary fission, reproduce at enormous speeds, and demonstrate unusual aggression. Later experiments with large cameras, to produce a larger ray, confirm that the same increased speed of reproduction applied to other organisms, such as frogs, which evolved and produced a next generation within two days. Persikov's invention quickly becomes known to journalists and eventually to foreign spies and to the GPU, the Soviet secret service. Meanwhile, the country is affected by an unknown disease in domesticated poultry, which results in the extinction of all chickens in Soviet Russia, with the plague stopping at the nation's borders. A sovkhoz manager, Aleksandr Semenovich Rokk, receives an official permission to confiscate Persikov's equipment and to use the invention to attempt to restore the chicken populace to the pre-plague level. However, the chicken eggs that are imported from outside the country are mistakenly sent to Persikov's laboratory, and the reptile eggs destined for the professor end up in the hands of the farmers. As a result, Rokk breeds an enormous quantity of large and overly-aggressive snakes, ostriches and crocodiles, which start attacking people. In the panic that follows, Persikov is killed by a mob, which blames him for the appearance of the snakes, and his cameras are smashed. The Red Army attempts to hold the snakes back, but only the coming of subzero weather in August, which is described as a deus ex machina, stops the snake invasion. An earlier draft has the novel end with the scene of Moscow's complete destruction by the snakes.

== Analysis and critical reception ==
A number of influences on the novel can be detected. One of its sources was H. G. Wells's 1904 novel The Food of the Gods and How It Came to Earth in which two scientists discover a way to accelerate growth, which at first results in a plague of gigantic chickens and eventually in an all-out war between people affected by growth and those who are not. The novel is in fact referenced in the text of the novel in a conversation between Persikov and his assistant. It has been noted that the death of the snakes from cold weather though they successfully resist the military force is reminiscent of the death of aliens from pathogenic bacteria in The War of the Worlds. Other influences may include rumours of "a giant reptile in the Crimea, to capture which a regiment of Red Guards was deployed."

The events of The Fatal Eggs are usually seen as a critique of Soviet Russia. Indeed, there is a case to be made for Professor Persikov's identification with Vladimir Ilyich Lenin, with a similar name, as both of them can be said to have unleashed destruction on Russia, and there seem to be similarities between them both in appearance and character. The chicken plague and the sanitary cordons that foreign countries established against it were seen as a parody of the ideas of internationalism and the Entente policy against it.

Although Bulgakov was not repressed, from 1925 he was questioned by the GPU several times and was never allowed to leave the Soviet Union, possibly as a result of his negative image, which was at least partly from the publication of The Fatal Eggs. Although there were positive responses, the novel was widely viewed as dangerous and anti-Soviet.

Bulgakov was aware that the story might be displeasing to the authorities. After he had presented the story at a literary evening in late 1924, he wrote in his diary: "Is it a satire? Or a provocative gesture?... I'm afraid that I might be hauled off... for all these heroic feats."

== English translations ==
There are a number of English translations of The Fatal Eggs, including:

- Mirra Ginsburg, Grove Press, 1968, ISBN 978-0-8021-3015-0
- Carl Proffer, in Diaboliad, Indiana University Press, 1972, ISBN 978-0-25311605-5
- Hugh Aplin, Hesperus Press, 2003, ISBN 978-1-84391-063-3
- Michael Karpelson, Translit Publishing, 2010, ISBN 978-0-9812695-2-8

== Adaptations in other media ==
- The 1981 episode "The Fatal Eggs" of the CBC Radio anthology series Nightfall.
- The 1995 Russian-Czech film adaptation The Fatal Eggs directed by Sergei Lomkin.
- The 2003 Russian animated film Well Forgotten Old Stuff loosely based on the novel.
- The two-part Italian TV adaptation Uova fatali was broadcast by RAI in 1977.
