= Diaboliad =

1924 fiction satire novel by Mikhail Bulgakov

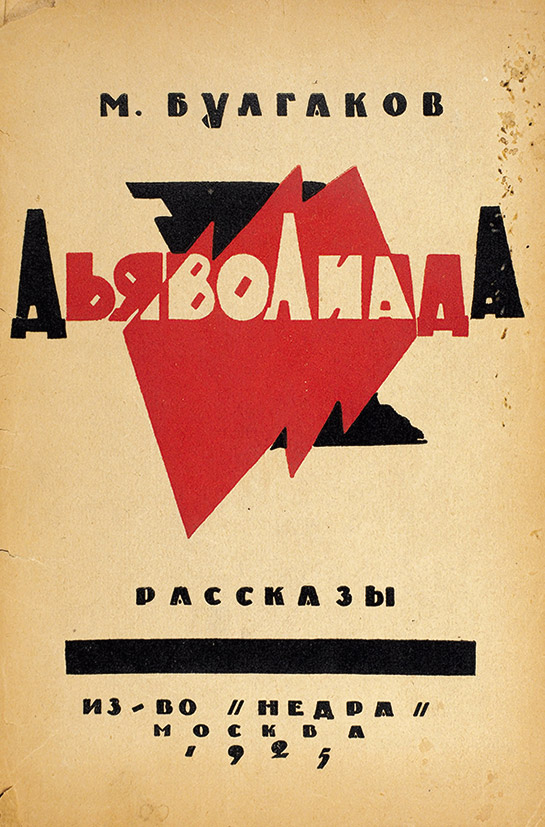
- 1925 book cover
- Author: Mikhail Bulgakov
- Language: Russian
- Genre: Fantasy; grotesque; satire
- Set in: Soviet Union
- Publisher: Nedra
- Publication date: 1924, Moscow
- Publication place: Soviet Union

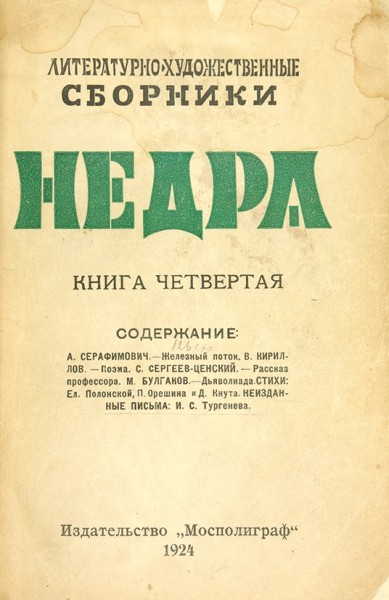
Cover of the Nedra almanac with the fist 1924 edition

Diaboliad (Russian: Дьяволиада) is a short story by Mikhail Bulgakov. It was the only story of his to be published as a book in his lifetime.

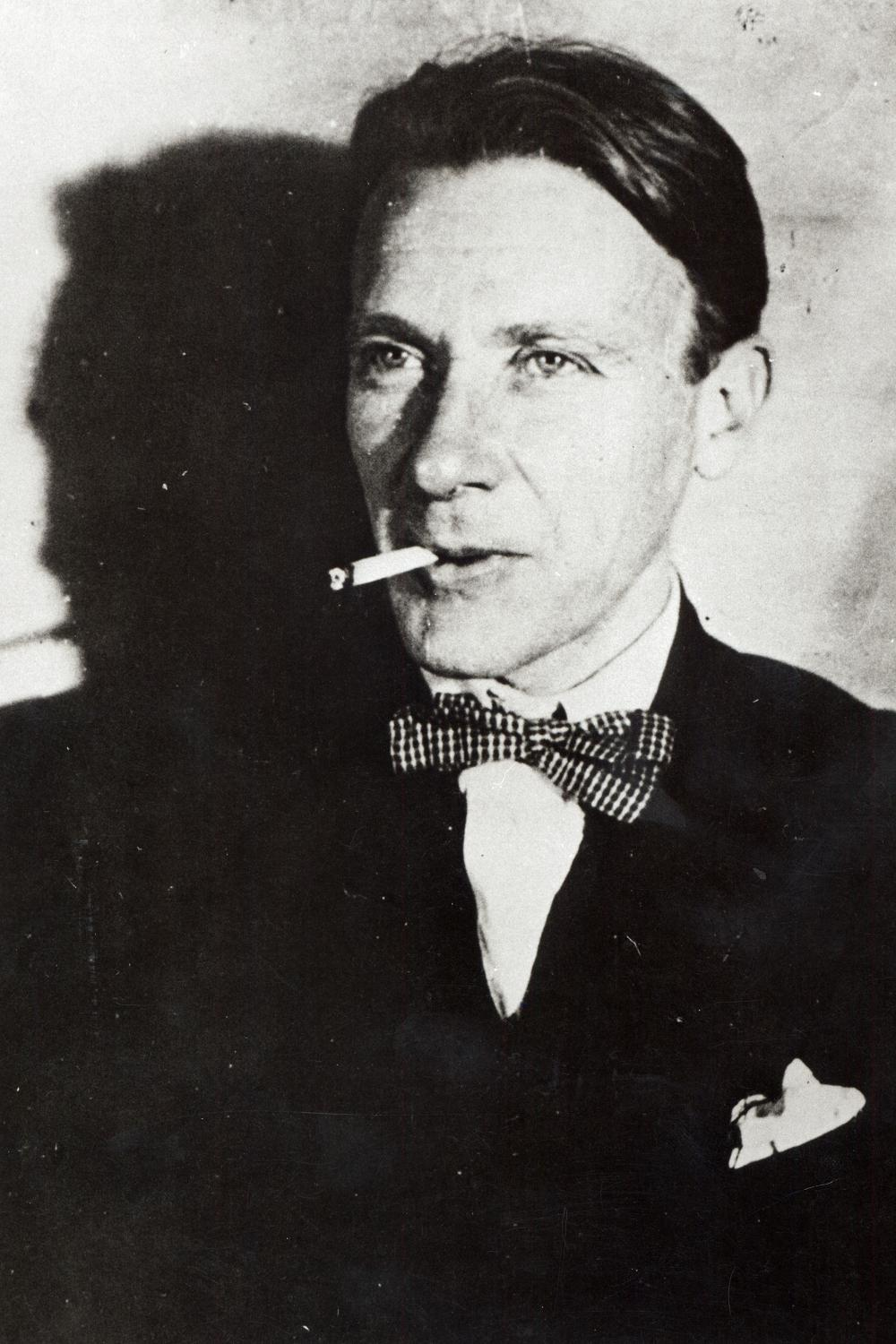
Mikhail Bulgakov in 1923.

== History ==
In 1923 Mikhail Bulgakov met Nikolai Semyonovich Angarsky (pen name of Nikolai Klestov), who was the senior editor and manager of the Nedra publishing house. After making his acquaintance, Angarsky began publishing Bulgakov's stories in the Nedra almanac, including "The Fatal Eggs". Bulgakov read the story to Aleksey Nikolayevich Tolstoy, who liked it very much, however Bulgakov himself noted in his diary twice that he himself was not pleased with the story. Diaboliad was first published in 1924. In 1925, the story was published separately as Bulgakov's own book. Two months after publication, the Joint State Political Directorate of the USSR confiscated the edition, although Angarskiy secured approval from the Glavlit to publish a second edition of the book. In 1926, it was successfully published again, however Bulgakov then cut ties with the publishing house. Literary critic Yevgeny Zamyatin lauded the story for its cinematic structure and blend of the fantastic and everyday. Contemporaries mentioned that the story was hilarious, however today it lost much of its humorous gist, because the context which the author's caustics hints was addressing is no longer known.

== Plot ==
Varfolomey Korotkov, the main character, is a clerk in a match factory with a tongue-twister name Главцентрбазспимат (GlavTsentrBazSpiMat), a style common in the Soviet Union of the time, standing for "Главная Центральная База Спичечных Материалов", or "Main Central Base of Match Materials". The factory is marked by disorder - employees receive their wages with constant delays; they are paid not with money, but with matches; and the management changes inexplicably often for unknown reasons. One day, a new manager is appointed to the factory. He immediately fires Korotkov for a minor mistake, who in return tries to justify himself. Suddenly it turns out that there are two completely identical managers of the factory, a shaved one and a bearded one. Korotkov's attempts to talk to the manager in regards to his position are in vain. Korotkov finally goes insane, and jumps from a high-rise building while being chased by criminal investigation.

== Themes ==
The story's main character, Korotkov, is portrayed as the classical "little man" literary hero that appeared in Russian literature during the realism epoch. Korotkov is portrayed as a victim of the Soviet bureaucratic machine. Bulgakov also uses references and literary techniques of both Nikolai Gogol and Fyodor Dostoevsky.
