= Bunsha =

Bunsha may refer to:

- Bunsha (shrine), a type of Shinto shrine
- Dionne Bunsha, Indian journalist and Climate and Conservation Engagement Coordinator at the University of British Columbia Botanical Gardens
- Ivan Vasilievich Bunsha, protagonist of the play Ivan Vasilievich by Mikhail Bulgakov and its film adaptation
