= Zoyka's Apartment =

1925 Russian play by Mikhail Bulgakov

- Written by: Mikhail Bulgakov
- Original language: Russian
- Subject: New Economic Policy
- Genre: Salon comedy, farcical tragedy

Premiere

Zoyka's Apartment (Russian: Зойкина квартира), also called Zoya's Apartment or Madame Zoyka, is a three-act play by Mikhail Bulgakov. Written in 1925, it is set during the period of the Soviet Union's New Economic Plan.

== Plot ==
The main protagonist of the play, thirty-five year old widow Zoya Denisovna, hopes to save up money to escape to France. She uses her multiple-room apartment to earn money under the guise of a fashion studio, in actuality an extravagant brothel at night, and in doing so exploits the system of the New Economic Plan.

== History ==
Bulgakov wrote the play in 1925 at the request of the Vakhtangov Theater, who approached with a request to write a comedy. It is believed Bulgakov had based the story on a real salon owned by a Zoya Shatova in the area of the Nikitsky Boulevard in Moscow; he had "heard of a woman called Zoya, who had run a dressmaking establishment that became a gambling den by night". He selected the location of the fictional apartment in Bol'shaya Sadovaya street, where he had previously lived with his first wife Tatianna Lappa. Bulgakov himself described the play as a "tragic buffonade".

The first reading of the play occurred on 11 January 1926. The premiere finally occurred on 28 October 1926. The play was performed also in other cities, such as Leningrad, Kiev, Rostov-on-Don, Sverdlovsk, and Baku. Bulgakov enjoyed great success with his play, it was quickly selling out in theaters, due in part to the skillful directing of Aleksey Dmitrievich Popov and dynamic stage directions set in the play. Although popular, it still was campaigned to be banned by Soviet authorities, and between November 1927 and April 1928 the play was taken off. Reportedly, Stalin had seen the play and liked it. In the end, the Politburo passed a resolution to lift the ban as it was "the Vakhtangov Theater's only means of existence". Nevertheless, it was banned on 17 March 1929, after 198 performances. The same year the play was translated into German, with Bulgakov's own permission, but never performed inside the USSR until 1984, although it continued to be performed abroad in Riga and Paris.

== Main characters ==
Sources:

- Zoya Denisovna, widower and owner of a fashion studio
- Manyushka, her maid
- Anisim Zotikovich Alliluya, ex-sergeant major, chairmain of the House Committee
- Pavel Fyodorovich Obolonsky, ex-count
- Alexander Tarasovich Ametisov, Zoya's cousin
- Boris Semyonovich Gus, sales director
- Gan-Dza-Lin (Gasolin) & Heruvim, Chinese laundrymen

== Sources ==
- Curtis, J.A.E. 2017. Critical Lives: Mikhail Bulgakov United Kingdom: Reaktion Books. ISBN 978-1-78023-741-1
- Milne, Lesley. 1991. Bulgakov Six Plays. United Kingdom: Methuen World Dramatists. ISBN 0-413-64530-4

== See also ==
- Bolshoi Theatre
- Russian literature
