= Ivan Vasilievich (play) =

Play by Mikhail Bulgakov

- Written by: Mikhail Bulgakov
- Characters: Ivan Vasilievich Bunsha-Koretskiy; Ivan the Terrible; George Miloslavskiy
- Original language: Russian
- Genre: Farce
- Setting: Moscow

Ivan Vasilievich is a play by Mikhail Bulgakov, written in the Soviet Union from 1934 until 1936. Performance of the play was forbidden upon its completion, and it was not published until 1965, a quarter century after Bulgakov's death.

The action takes place in Moscow, where a malfunctioning time machine sends apartment building superintendent Ivan Vasilievich Bunsha-Koretsky to the 16th century and brings tsar Ivan the Terrible into the 20th century. The title is a reference to the fact that Ivan the Terrible shares the patronymic Vasilievich with the superintendent. In comparing the tsar's authority with that of a Soviet official, the play satirizes similarities between the Soviet Union and Russian Tsardom, as well as Joseph Stalin's rehabilitation of Ivan the Terrible.

The play was adapted into the 1973 film Ivan Vasilievich: Back to the Future by Soviet director Leonid Gaidai, starring Yury Yakovlev as both the superintendent and the tsar. Aleksandr Demyanenko played the scientist responsible for the time machine, linking the adaptation to Gaidai's other movies starring Demyanenko as the character Shurik.
