= Elena Bulgakova =

Soviet author and intellectual (1893–1970)

- Елена Сергеевна Булгакова
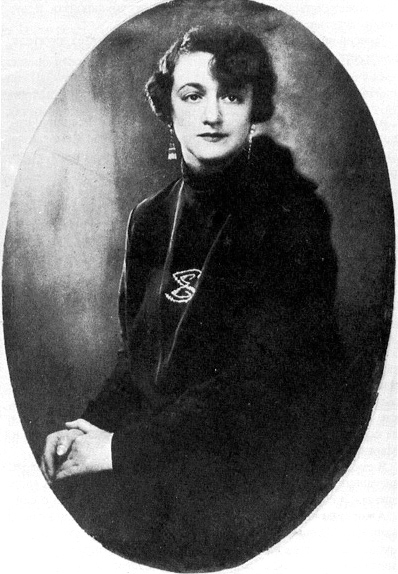
- Born: 21 October 1893 (in Julian calendar); Riga
- Died: 18 July 1970; Moscow
- Occupations: Translator, secretary
- Notable work: The Master and Margarita
- Spouse: Mikhail Bulgakov

Elena Sergeevna Bulgakova (in Russian: Елена Сергеевна Булгакова; 21 October 1893 – 18 July 1970) was a Soviet author and intellectual. In collaboration with her husband, Mikhail Bulgakov, she participated in the writing of The Master and Margarita, a central work of Russian literature. Additionally, she is depicted in the novel as the character Margarita.

Bulgakova continued the work of writing and editing the text after her husband's death in March 1940. She published the first edition, although censored by Soviet authorities, in 1941. She was one of the first dissenting authors in the USSR. She died in Moscow in 1970.

== Biography ==
She was born on 21 October 1893, in Riga as the daughter of Sergej Markovich Njurenberg. Her family was connected to the Moscow theater world; for example, her sister Olga worked as a secretary for Vladimir Nemirovich-Danchenko. Between 1933 and 1940, she kept a diary, which is useful for reconstructing her life, that of Mikhail Bulgakov, and the Soviet artistic world.

Bulgakova supported her husband against censorship and press campaigns orchestrated by Stalin against him. When he was completely censored for a Soviet jubilee, she wrote:

Well, just think of it. Among the jubilee productions, they did not include Days of the Turbins, which has run for thirteen years, more than eight hundred shows!! This is unique among plays by a Soviet author. Not only that, there is no mention in any article either of Bulgakov's name or the title of the play.

Writing and editing of The Master and Margarita

Bulgakova appears to be represented by the character Margarita in the novel. While the bulk of the work was undertaken by her husband, it was a shared creative process, as she was his muse, and he resumed writing after marrying her. Thus, not only did she inspire him, but after his death in 1940, Bulgakova took up his notes and had to make numerous editorial decisions. She extensively revised her husband's notes, selected readings of the text, and even added text in many places. She completed and edited the work in less than a year. About 12% of the novel was censored by Soviet authorities upon its release.

=== Later life and death ===
Bulgakova remained connected to the Soviet intellectual, and even dissident, circles, receiving visits from figures such as Anna Akhmatova between 1942 and 1944. She died on 18 July 1970, in Moscow.

== Legacy ==
Apart from her significance in The Master and Margarita, she is credited, along with Bulgakov, as being one of the founding artists of the clandestine and dissident artistic culture in the USSR.
