= Batum (play) =

Batum (Russian: Батум) is a play in four acts by the Soviet writer Mikhail Bulgakov, who began writing the play in 1936 and completed it on July 24, 1939. The play, about the strikes organized by Stalin in Batumi in 1901 and 1902, was banned by the dictator in 1939. The text was published in its original form in 1977 by Ardis Publishing in Ann Arbor, Michigan. In the Soviet Union, the play was printed in the Moscow literary journal Sovremennaja dramaturgija in 1988. In 1991, Sergei Kurginyan brought Batum to the stage of the Moscow Art Theatre.

== Overview ==
In July 1903, the Russian Minister of Justice proposes to Tsar Nicholas II that the peasant Joseph Vissarionovich Dzhugashvili be exiled to Eastern Siberia for three years as punishment. The state criminal, born in 1878 from Gori, Tiflis Governorate, had incited the Batumi workers to strike in March 1902. The ruler approves the proposal.

In the winter of 1904, the exiled Dzhugashvili manages to escape from the Irkutsk Governorate. Stalin returns to Batumi.

== Content ==
The Russian bureaucracy of the time refers to Joseph Vissarionovich Dzhugashvili, alias Stalin, as a peasant. The insolent delinquent had been expelled in 1898 at the age of 19 from the 6th class of the Theological Seminary in Tbilisi "for belonging to anti-government circles." The "unreliable" seminarian is taken in by the Tbilisi Observatory and organizes strikes among the Tbilisi railway workers.

November 1901 in Batumi: Stalin, who is called Sosso by the workers or, because of his educational background at the theological seminary, Soul Shepherd, takes shelter with a Batumi working-class family. Sent by the Tbilisi Committee of the RSDLP, Stalin organizes the Batumi workers, formulates demands, and rallies the exploited to fight. When, for example, a factory in the Caspian-Black Sea Oil Industry burns, the factory manager demands a reward for putting out the fire.

In early March 1902, the military governor of Kutaisi is alarmed. The Batumi police chief has telegraphed that after the factory manager Wansheidt, called "bloodsuckers" by the workers, fired 375 workers at the Rothschild factory, things are in turmoil. Colonel Vladimir Eduardovich Treinitz, deputy head of the gendarmerie administration in Kutaisi, is aware of the situation. The agitator is called Soul Shepherd. The workers demand a reduction of the 16-hour workday to 10 hours, early closure on Sundays at 4 p.m., the abolition of arbitrary fines, the reinstatement of all fired workers, and the elimination of corporal punishment. The governor—always fearless and present at the hotspots—has three of the leaders arrested.

When the workers demonstrate for the release of the prisoners, shots are fired at the gate of the police barracks. There are fatalities among the workers. Stalin—still not arrested—leads the demonstrators. A month later, in April 1903, Stalin is arrested in the apartment of worker Darispan by Treinitz. Stalin had given his full name as Ilja Grigorjewitsch Nisheradse. The lie did not help. The gendarmes knew better.

In the summer of 1903, Stalin is still behind bars. He complains to the governor about a female prisoner being beaten.

Treinitz comes to pick up Stalin. For "farewell," each prison guard he passes strikes him with the saber's scabbard.

When Tsar Nicholas II approves the aforementioned exile, he comments: "Holy Russia has mild laws."

== Stalin ==
Schröder writes in June 1995:

- When Stalin banned the play, he emphasized the modest statesman. At that time, he was not an exception; many youths—like him—had been active in the past.
- Bulgakov had followed the official Stalin biographies. If he once deviated from this premise—such as when Tsar Nicholas II personally intervenes in the punishment of the 1903 revolutionary who was still unknown at court—it would have flattered Stalin.
- It is possible that Stalin saw an analogy in the Tsarist penal system to his own Soviet penal system.
- The banning of the play could be seen as one of the factors that contributed to the outbreak of the illness that Bulgakov succumbed to in late winter 1940.

== German-language editions ==
Used edition:

- Batum. Play in four acts. Translated from the Russian by Thomas Reschke. pp. 135–208 in Ralf Schröder (Ed.): Bulgakov. The Cabal of the Hypocrites. Alexander Pushkin. Batum. Plays. Volk & Welt, Berlin 1995, ISBN 3-353-00952-3 (= Vol. 11: Collected Works (13 vols.))
