= Flight (play) =

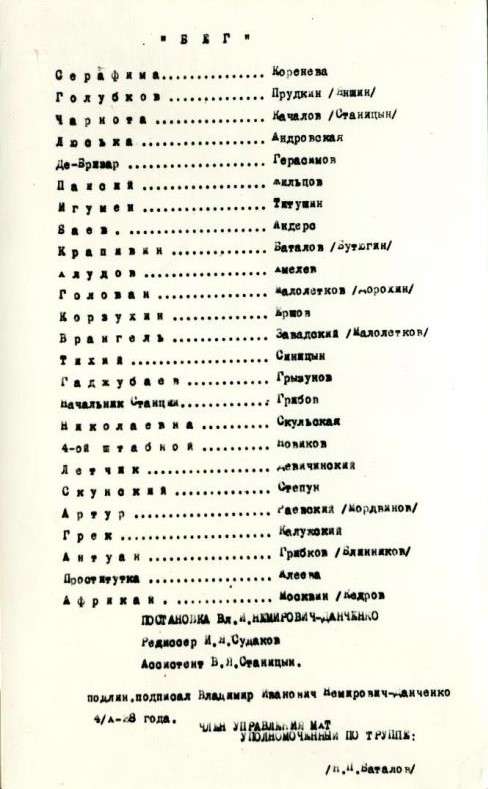
- Written by: Mikhail Bulgakov
- Original language: Russian
- Subject: Russian 1918-1920 Civil War

Flight, or On the Run, is a play by Mikhail Bulgakov. It is set during the end of the Russian Civil War, when the remnants of the White Army are desperately resisting the Red Army on the Crimean isthmus. The lives of the abandoned Serafima Korzukhina, the university professor Sergei Golubkov and the White generals Charnota and Khludov are closely intertwined.

Written in 1927, the play was rehearsed but never allowed to be performed during Bulgakov's lifetime, as the authorities felt that it glorified the Whites. It wasn't played until 1957, 17 years after Bulgakov's death.

The play's English premiere was at the Bristol Old Vic Theatre in 1972, directed by Val May.

The play is the basis for the 1970 Soviet film The Flight.

In 1972 Valentin Bibik composed the opera Flight, op.12/45, based on the play. The final 1996 version of the opera was premiered in 2010 in Kyiv Philharmonic hall under conductor Roman Kofman.
