= Ivan Vasilievich: Back to the Future =

Ivan Vasilievich Changes His Profession
- Evseev-Zolotarevsky's film poster
- Directed by: Leonid Gaidai
- Screenplay by: Vladlen Bakhnov; Leonid Gaidai
- Based on: Ivan Vasilievich by Mikhail Bulgakov
- Starring: Yury Yakovlev; Leonid Kuravlyov; Aleksandr Demyanenko
- Music by: Aleksandr Zatsepin
- Release dates: June 1973 (U.S.); 17 September 1973 (Soviet Union)
- Running time: 93 minutes
- Country: Soviet Union
- Language: Russian

Ivan Vasilievich Changes His Profession (Russian: Иван Васильевич меняет профессию, romanized: Ivan Vasilyevich menyayet professiyu) is a 1973 Soviet science fiction comedy film directed by Leonid Gaidai. In the United States, the film has sometimes been sold under the title Ivan Vasilievich: Back to the Future. This film is based on the play Ivan Vasilievich written by Mikhail Bulgakov from 1934 until 1936. It was one of the most attended films in the Soviet Union in 1973, with more than 60 million tickets sold.

== Plot ==
External videos
- Conversation with happiness ("Разговор со счастьем") "Knyaz" Miloslavsky tries to distract attention from the drunken Bunsha by performing a song with the Tsar's ensemble

The story begins in 1973 Moscow, where engineer Aleksandr "Shurik" Timofeyev (Aleksandr Demyanenko) is working on a time machine in his apartment. By accident, he sends Ivan Vasilievich Bunsha (Yury Yakovlev), superintendent of his apartment building, and George Miloslavsky (Leonid Kuravlyov), a burglar, back into the 16th century — the time of tsar Ivan IV "The Terrible". The pair is forced to disguise themselves, with Bunsha dressing up as tsar Ivan IV and Miloslavsky as a knyaz (prince) of the same name. At the same time, the real Ivan IV (also played by Yury Yakovlev) is sent by the same machine into Shurik's apartment, and he has to deal with modern-day life while Shurik tries to fix the machine so that everyone can be brought back to their proper timelines. Superintendent Bunsha and Tsar Ivan IV are lookalikes but have completely different personalities, which results in the comedy of mistaken identity. As the Militsiya (police), tipped off by a neighbor who was burgled by Miloslavsky, close in on Shurik, who is frantically trying to repair the machine, the cover of Bunsha and Miloslavsky is blown and they have to fight off the Streltsy (tsar's guards), who have figured out that Bunsha is an impostor. The film ends with Bunsha, Miloslavsky, and Ivan IV all transported back to their proper timelines, although the entire episode is revealed to be a dream by Shurik... or was it?

== Cast ==
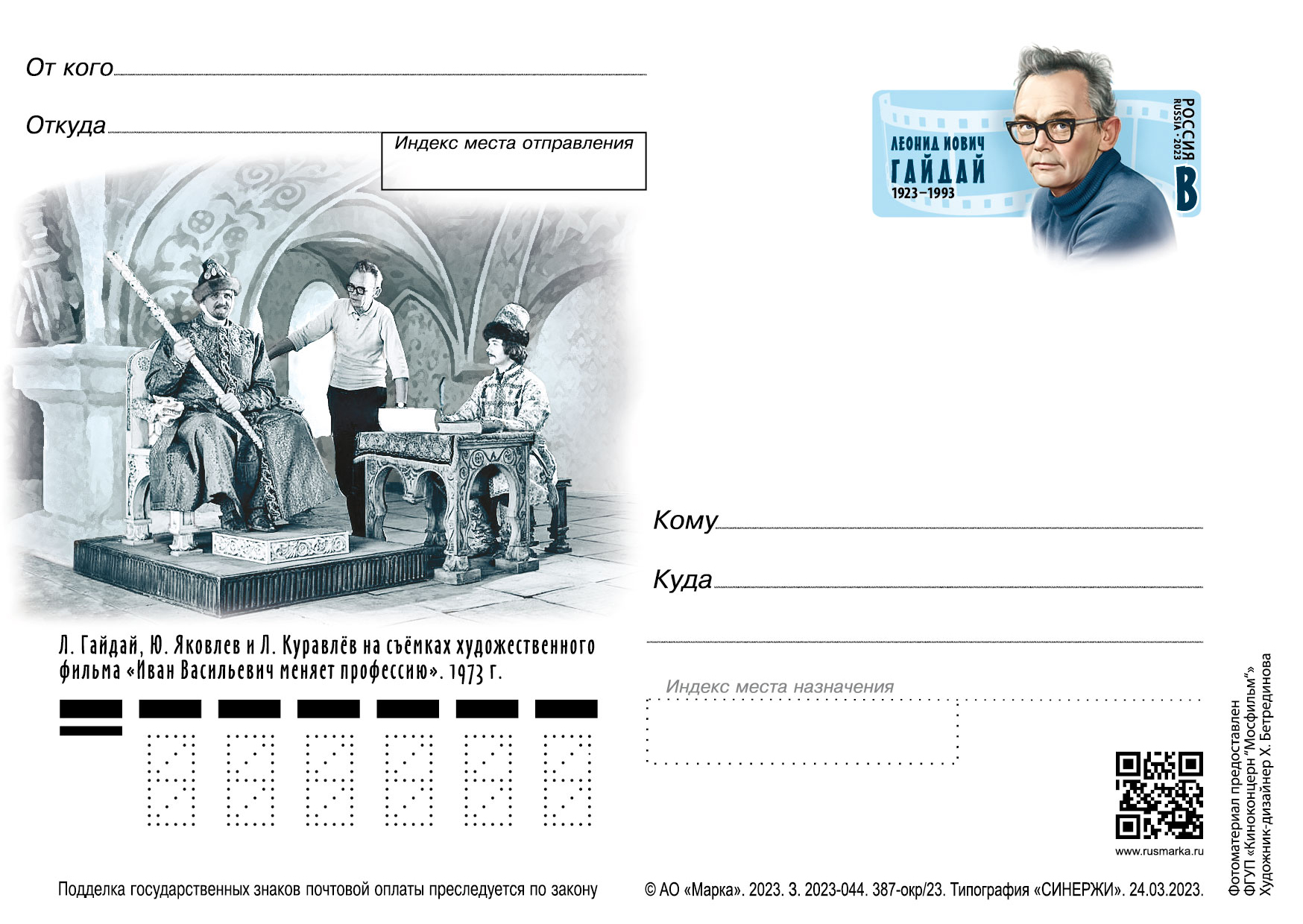
2023 postal cover of Russia dedicated to the film. Its left image shows, left to right: Yakovlev as Ivan Bunsha dressing up as the Ivan Terrible, Gaidai, and Kuravlyov. The right image shows Gaidai.

- Yury Yakovlev - Ivan the Terrible / Ivan Vasilievich Bunsha, building superintendent
- Leonid Kuravlyov - George Miloslavsky, burglar
- Aleksandr Demyanenko - Aleksandr 'Shurik' Timofeyev, inventor
- Savely Kramarov - Feofan the diak
- Natalya Seleznyova - Zinaida, Shurik's wife
- Natalya Krachkovskaya - Uliana Andreevna Bunsha, superintendent's wife
- Natalya Kustinskaya - Yakin's mistress
- Vladimir Etush - Anton Semyonovich Shpak, dentist
- Mikhail Pugovkin - film director Yakin
- Sergey Filippov - Swedish ambassador
- Edward Bredun - black market seller
- Natalia Gurzo - Shpak's dental nurse
- Nina Maslova - Tsarina Marfa Sobakina
- Viktor Uralsky - Police sergeant-major
- Ivan Zhevago - Psychiatrist

== Production ==
=== Film locations ===
- Moscow, Russian SFSR. The modern Moscow location is New Arbat Avenue, formerly Kalinin Prospekt – then, and perhaps still now, a fairly prestigious location of Moscow, which is not too far from the Kremlin.
- Rostov Kremlin, Rostov, Russian SFSR
- Yalta, Crimean Oblast, Ukrainian SSR

=== Props ===
The time machine for the film was created by the artist, wood sculptor and cartoonist Vyacheslav Pochechuev. The original version of the time machine, manufactured by a special bureau, turned out to be an expressionless layout of a standard computer. Pochechuev sketched a new model and, with the help of a designer, a locksmith and a glassblower, created a new time machine in a few days, causing the audience to feel a miracle. Pochechuev received a prize of 40 rubles, and in the certificate from the accounting department it was written: "The money was issued for the invention of a time machine."

=== Soundtrack ===
Nina Brodskaya performed the song "Zvenit yanvarskaya vyuga" (Russian: Звенит январская вьюга, lit. 'The January blizzard is ringing') for the film. It was also recorded by Sofia Rotaru. In 2014, Italian pop punk band Vanilla Sky recorded a cover of this song along with a music video.

Lev Polosin & Boris Kuznetsov and the Moscow Military District Choir performed the song "Kap-Kap-Kap" ("Marusya"). Valery Zolotukhin performed the song «Razgovor so schast'em» (Russian: Разговор со счастьем, lit. 'Conversation with happiness').

== In mass media ==
On September 21, 2016, Google celebrated the 43rd anniversary of the film with a Google Doodle.

In November 2020, Sberbank released an advertisement in which George Miloslavsky went to Moscow on a time machine in the sample of 2020. The image of Miloslavsky was recreated using Deepfake technology.

== The remake ==
On the 2023 New Year's night, the TNT TV channel aired a parody titled Ivan Vasilyevich Changes Everything. The reception was mixed.
