= The White Guard =

1925 novel by Mikhail Bulgakov

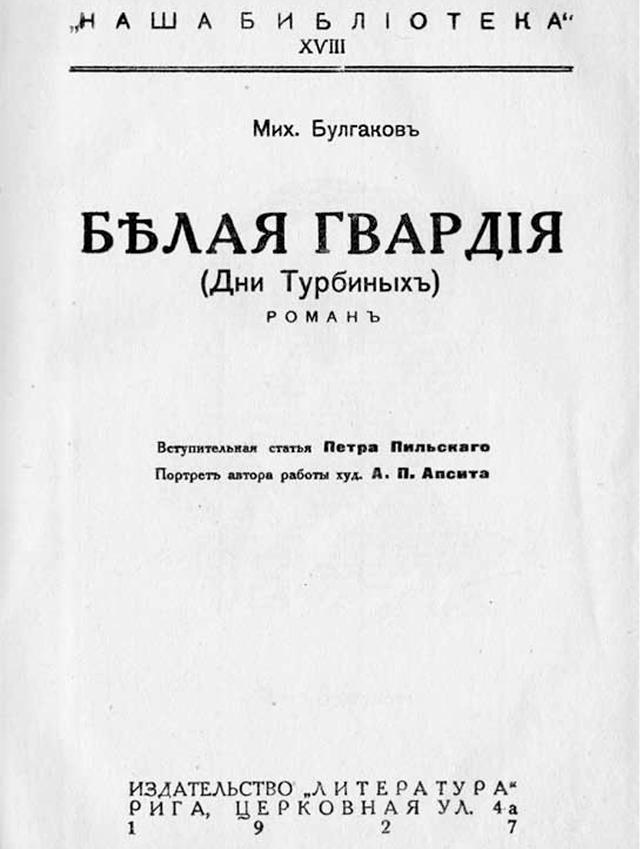
- 1927 émigré edition published in Riga
- Author: Mikhail Bulgakov
- Original title: Белая гвардия
- Language: Russian
- Publisher: Rossiya (serial)
- Publication date: 1925
- Publication place: Soviet Union
- English publication date: 1971
- Media type: Print

The White Guard (Russian: Белая гвардия, romanized: Belaja gvardija) is a novel by Mikhail Bulgakov, first published in 1925 in the literary journal Rossiya. It was not reprinted in the Soviet Union until 1966.

== Background ==
The White Guard first appeared in serial form in the Soviet-era literary journal Rossiya in 1925, but the journal was closed down before the serial was completed. The complete book was published in Paris in 1927. A censored version was published in the Soviet Union in 1966. The complete version was published in 1989.

After the first two installments of The White Guard had been published in Rossiya, Bulgakov was invited to write a version for the stage. He called the play The Days of the Turbins. It was produced at the Moscow Art Theatre, to great acclaim. According to some sources, Stalin saw it no fewer than 20 times.

In fact, the play completely overshadowed the book, which was in any event virtually unobtainable in any form in the Soviet Union.

== Plot ==
Set in Ukraine from late 1918, the novel concerns the fate of the Turbin family as the various armies of the Ukrainian War of Independence (the White Army, the Red Army, the Imperial German Army and Ukrainian nationalists) fight over the city of Kiev. Historical figures such as Pyotr Wrangel, Symon Petliura and Hetman Pavlo Skoropadsky appear as the Turbin family is caught up in the turbulent effects of the October Revolution.

== Composition and sources ==
The novel contains many autobiographical elements. Bulgakov gave the younger Turbin brother some of the characteristics of his own younger brother. The description of the house of the Turbins is that of the house of the Bulgakov family in Kiev. It is now preserved and operated as the Mikhail Bulgakov Museum.

The novel's characters belong to the sphere of Ukrainian and Russian intellectuals and officers in the army of Skoropadsky and participate in defending the city from the Ukrainian nationalist forces, led by Petliura, in December 1918. The character Mikhail Shpolyansky is modelled on Viktor Shklovsky.

== Characters ==
- Alexey Vasilyevich Turbin, a physician
- Nikolai Turbin (Nikolka), his younger brother
- Elena Vasilyevna Talberg, their sister
- Sergei Ivanovich Talberg, her husband
- Viktor Viktorovich Myshlaevsky, lieutenant
- Leonid Yuryevich Shervinsky, aide to Prince Belorukov
- Fyodor Nikolaievich Stepanov, nicknamed Carp (Karas)
- Father Alexander
- Vasily Ivanovich Lisovich, nicknamed Vasilisa
- Larion Larionovich Surzhansky (Lariosik)
- Colonel Nai-Turs

== English translations ==
Bulgakov's widow had The White Guard published in large part in the literary journal Moskva in 1966, at the end of the Khrushchev era. It was the basis for the English translation by Michael Glenny, first published in 1971, which lacks the dream flashback sections. In 2008, Yale University Press published a translation by Marian Schwartz of the complete novel, an edition that won an award.

- The White Guard, translated by Michael Glenny, London: Collins and Harvill Press, 1971. ISBN 0002619059.
  - London: Harvill, 1996. Revised edition. ISBN 1860462189.
- White Guard, translated by Marian Schwartz, introduction by Evgeny Dobrenko. New Haven: Yale University Press, 2008. ISBN 978-0-300-15145-9
- The White Guard, translated by Roger Cockrell. Richmond: Alma Classics, 2016. ISBN 978-1-84749-245-6.

== Adaptations ==
- The Days of the Turbins, a 1925 stage adaptation written by Bulgakov.
- The Days of the Turbins, a 1976 3-part television adaptation of the play.
- Play of the Month: The White Guard - BBC One adaptation (1982)
- The White Guard, a 2012 mini-series adaptation of the book.
