= The Cabal of Hypocrites =

Four-act play by Mikhail Bulgakov

- Original language: Russian
- Written by: Mikhail Bulgakov
- Genre: Realistic drama

Premiere
- Date: 16 February 1936
- Place: Moscow Art Theatre

The Cabal of Hypocrites (Russian: Кабала святош, romanized: Kabala svyatosh), also known as Molière, is a four-act play by Mikhail Bulgakov.

Written in 1929 for the Moscow Art Theatre, it was read by Bulgakov for the theatre director Konstantin Stanislavski and his team at the 19 January 1930 meeting. The play, accepted by the theatre for production, was promptly banned by the state Repertoire Committee (Glavrepertkom). A year and a half later, after personal interference by Maxim Gorky, the ban was lifted. In March 1932 the rehearsals started, under the guidance of the director Nikolai Gorchakov. They lasted for four years and became the major cause for the rift between Bulgakov and Stanislavski who in 1935 decided he did not want to do anything with the play and asked Vladimir Nemirovich-Danchenko to deal with it from then on.

The play premiered on 16 February 1936 and enjoyed huge success. But on 9 March the article "Glamorous on the Surface, False Beneath" appeared in Pravda and Molière was banned, after just seven sold out performances. In October that year Bulgakov left the Moscow Art Theatre calling it in his diary "the graveyard of my plays" and referring to it as "the theatre where Molière had been destroyed" in a letter to his friend Vikenty Veresayev.

The Cabal of Hypocrites was published for the first time in 1962 by the Iskusstvo Publishers. It enjoyed great revival in the Soviet Theatre during the 1960s and is considered now part of the legacy of classic Russian drama.
