= Nikolai Klestov =

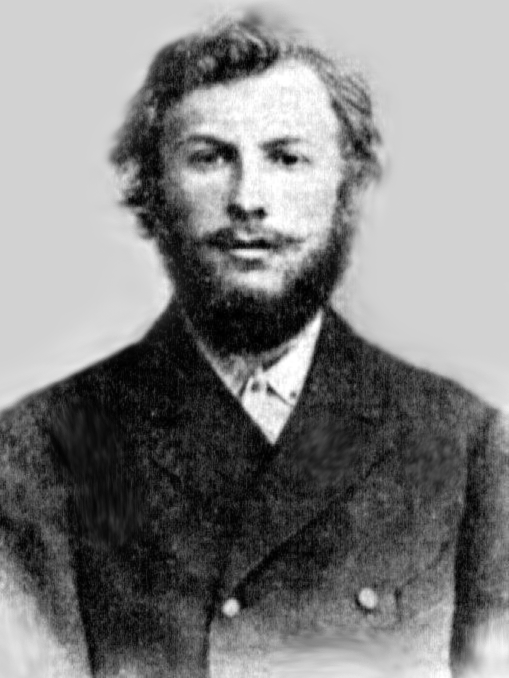
Nikolai Klestov

Nikolai Semenovich Klestov (Russian: Николай Семёнович Клестов; December 1873, Smolensk – 27 July 1941, Kommunarka shooting ground, Moscow Oblast) who worked with the pen name Angarsky, was a Russian Bolshevik revolutionary, political writer and publicist.

== Political activity ==
Following the February Revolution in 1917, Klestov became a member of the Bolsheviks (RSDLP(B)) and was a member of the Executive Committee of the Moscow Soviet, running their press section. He attended the Seventh (April) Conference and Sixth Congress of the RSDLP(B), at which he was criticised by Stalin. He participated in the October Revolution in Moscow and played a role in the Military Revolutionary Committee, Khamovniki district of Moscow. He worked for the Moscow Soviet until 1929. He was appointed trade representative for the USSR in Lithuania from 1929 to 1931 and then in Greece from 1932 to 1936.

In May 1940 he was arrested on charges of espionage and, after a forced confession, executed in July 1941 at the Kommunarka shooting ground.

He was rehabilitated in 1956. In 1968, a library in the city of Angarsk was named after him; his daughter Maria oversaw work with the library. In July 1985, the Central City Library of Smolensk was also named after him.

== Publishing ==
He published works by Karl Marx, Alexander Bogdanov and Vladimir Lenin, alongside other publications for the Russian Social Democratic Labor Party before being exiled to Angarsky District, Siberia. He then adopted the pseudonym Angarsky. Klestov wrote works on party history and that of the revolutionary movement, as well as literary criticism.

He edited the journal Tvorchestvo (1919–22), the literary collections Nedra (1922–24), and ran the Nedra Publishing House (1924–29).

In 1936 he became chairman Mezhdunarodnaia Kniga (International Book), of the foreign book trade association for the USSR. In 1939 he started work at the Marx–Engels–Lenin Institute.

Nedra (both almanac and publishing house) are known for publishing Mikhail Bulgakov's stories.

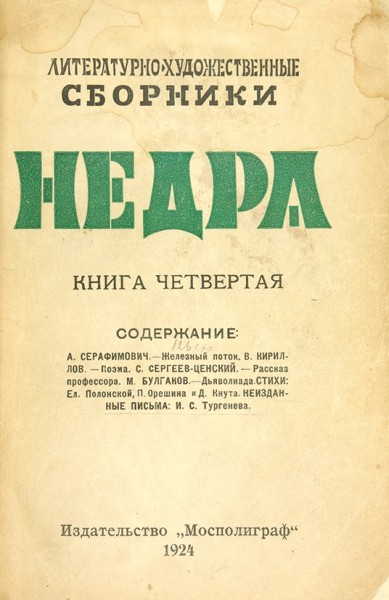
Nedra almanac, 1924

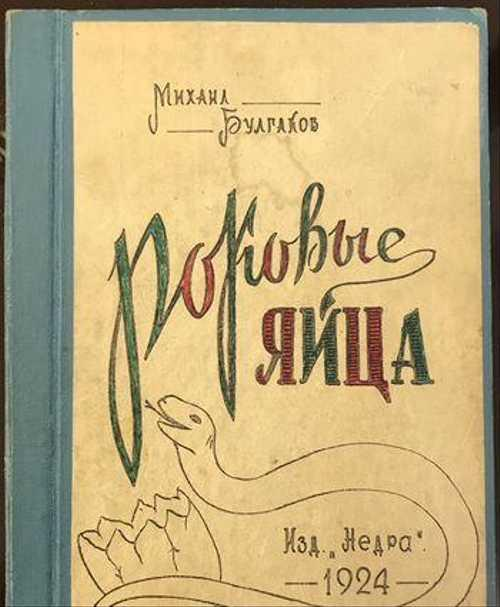
Nedra Publishers, 1924

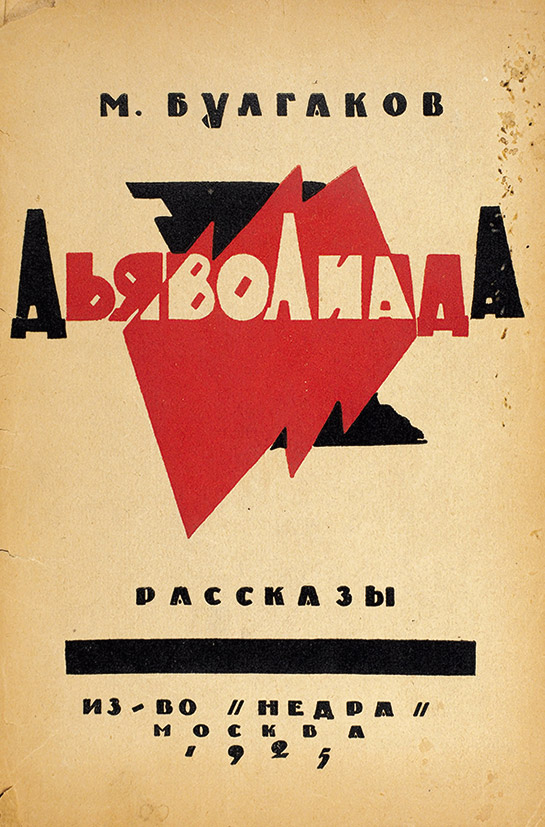
Nedra Publishers, 1925
