= The Days of the Turbins =

Play by Mikhail Bulgakov

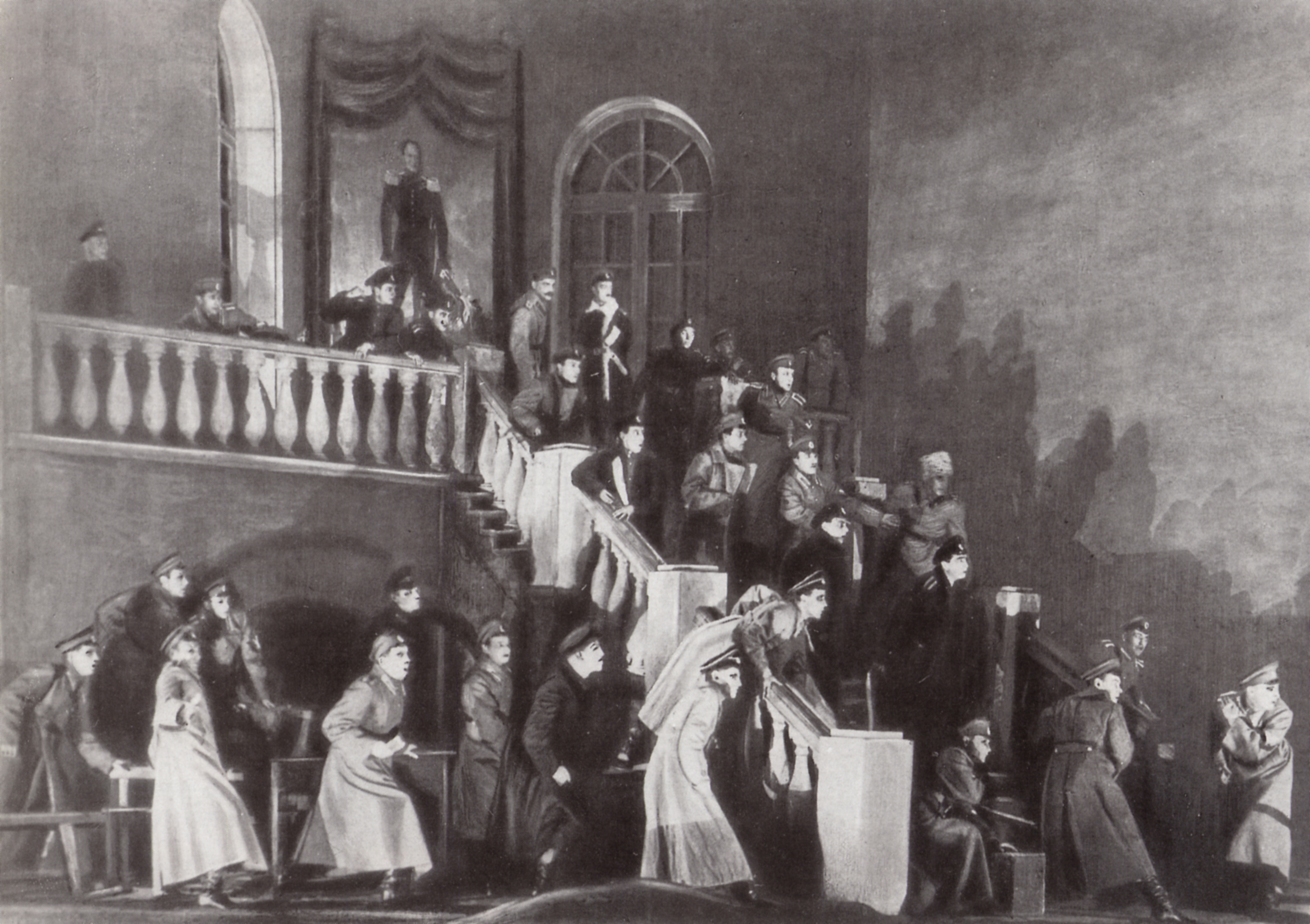
- Stanislavski's production of Mikhail Bulgakov's The Days of the Turbins (1926), with scenic design by Nikolai Ulyanov.
- Original language: Russian
- Written by: Mikhail Bulgakov
- Subject: Russian 1918-1920 Civil War
- Genre: Realistic drama
- Setting: Kiev, 1919

Premiere
- Date: 5 October 1926
- Place: Moscow Art Theatre

The Days of the Turbins (Russian: Дни Турбиных, romanized: Dni Turbinykh) is a four-act play by Mikhail Bulgakov that is based upon his novel The White Guard.

It was written in 1925 and premiered on 5 October 1926 in Moscow Art Theatre (MAT) and was directed by Konstantin Stanislavsky. In April 1929, the production was canceled as a result of severe criticism in the Soviet press. On 16 February 1932, the direct interference of Joseph Stalin resulted in the play being resumed, and it continued until June 1941, to considerable public acclaim. It ran for 987 performances in the course of those ten years.

There are three versions of the play's text. The first was written in July to September 1925. The title The Days of the Turbins was also used for the novel itself since its Paris (1927, 1929, Concorde) edition was called The Days of the Turbins (The White Guard). The play's second version was never published in Russian but was translated into German and first came out in Munich in 1934. The third version of the text was published in Moscow in 1955 and was supervised personally by the author and Bulgakov's widow Elena Sergeevna Bulgakova.

== Background ==
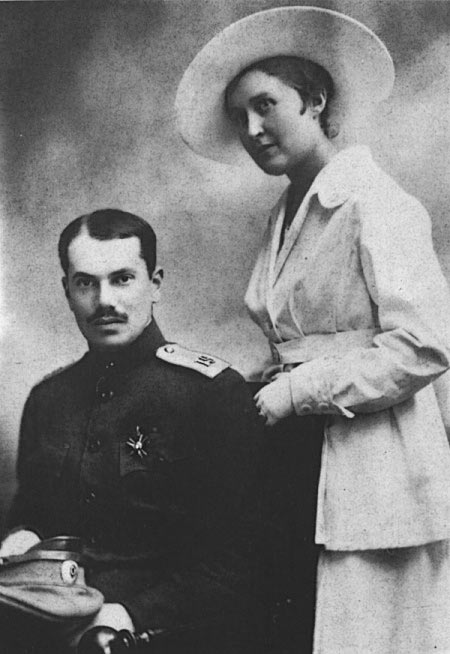
Talberg's prototype Leonid Karum with his wife Varvara

When the Moscow Art Theatre approached Bulgakov in 1925 and suggested that he should write a play for it to stage, the author had been toying with that idea for some time. In 1920, while in Vladikavkaz, he had written a play, The Turbin Brothers, which was set during the times of the 1905 Revolution, and since then, he had been thinking of coming up with some kind of sequel.

As well as the novel The White Guard, which served as a blueprint for it, the play was based upon its author's personal experience in Kiev in late 1918 and early 1919. Then, at the height of the Russian Civil War, the city succumbed to anarchy and violence.

Like the novel before it, the play had a strong autobiographical aspect to it. The description of the house of the Turbins corresponds to that of the house of the Bulgakov family in Kiev, which is now the Mikhail Bulgakov Museum.

Bulgakov's maternal grandmother, Anfisa Ivanovna, married name Pokrovskaya, was born Turbina, which caused the name of the fictional family. The character of Alexey Turbin could be seen as a self-portrait. Nikolka Turbin bears strong resemblance to the author's real brother, Nikolai Bulgakov. The real person behind Elena Talberg-Turbina was Bulgakov's sister Varvara Afanasyevna. The prototype for the cynical careerist Colonel Talberg was Varvara's husband, Leonid Sergeyevich Karum (1888–1968), who first served under Hetman Pavlo Skoropadsky, later joined Anton Denikin's army and ended up as an instructor in a Red Army military school. Such an interpretation of his character caused a family row and a rift between Bulgakov and the Karums.

The character of Myshlayevsky apparently had no immediate real-life prototype, but some sources point to Nikolai Syngayevsky, the author's friend during his years of childhood, but by way of bizarre coincidence, it "found" itself one, in retrospect. During the 1926-1927 season the MAT offices received a letter addressed to Bulgakov, signed "Viktor Viktorovich Myshalyevsky." In its introduction, its author implied that Bulgakov had known him personally and "expressed interest" in his life story. The letter told the story of a former White Army officer who had joined the Red Army, initially even with some enthusiasm, only to become totally disillusioned with the Bolshevik regime and the new Soviet reality.

== History ==
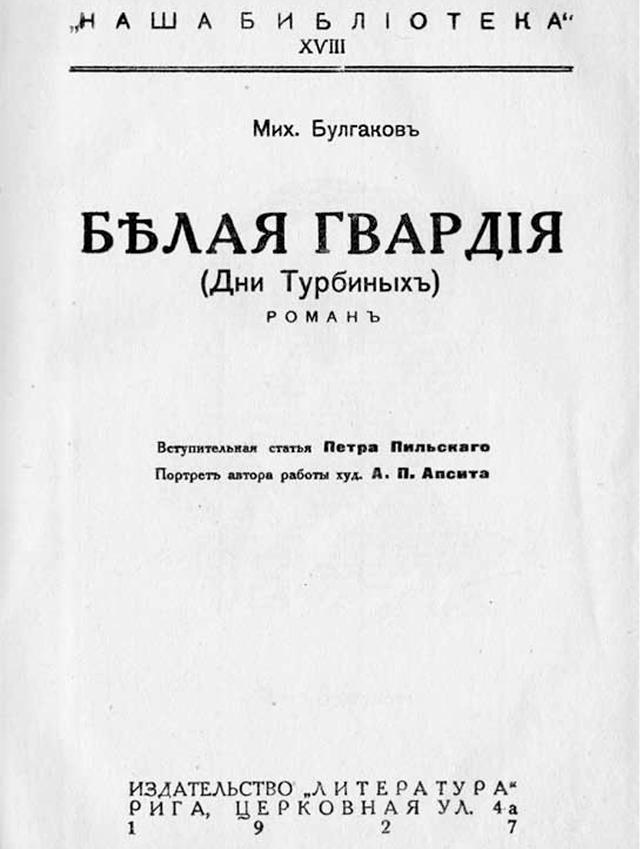
The title page of the 'pirate' 1927 Riga-published version of The White Guard novel

On 3 April 1925, the Moscow Art Theatre's Second Studio co-director, who was later a respected Soviet reader in drama, Boris Vershilov, invited Bulgakov to visit him at the theatre and to suggest him to write a play that would be based upon The White Guard. Bulgakov set upon working on it in July and finished the first draft in September. That month, he recited it for the audience of the theatre's actors and officials, which included Stanislavski. Its first version closely followed the novel's plotline and featured the characters Malyshev and Nai-Turs, and Alexey Turbin was still an army doctor.

Stanislavski found the original plotline overdrawn and laden with too many characters, some of which were indistinguishable from the others. The second draft has no Nai-Turs, whose lines were given to Colonel Malyshev. By the January 1926 final casting, Malyshev was also gone, and Alexey Turbin became the artillery colonel, as well a kind of proponent for the White movement's ideology

The next change was prompted by censors. The scene at the (Ukrainian nationalist leader) Symon Petliura's headquarters had to be removed because the atmosphere of anarchic violence there, apparently, resonated too strongly with many people's reminiscences of the Russian Civil War's realities relating to the atrocities committed by the Red Army.

The title "The White Guard" also caused problems. Stanislavski, trying to appease the Repertoire Committee (Glavrepertkom) suggested that it should be called "Before the End" (Перед концом), but Bulgakov vehemently protested. In August 1926, they finally agreed on The Days of the Turbins. On 25 September 1926, the play received permission to be produced on stage for the MAT exclusively if the revolutionary hymn "The Internationale" was played crescendo in the finale. Also, several new lines were given to Myshlayevsky to indicate that he was bitterly disillusioned, with the White movement and was now ready to join the Red Army.

The Days of the Turbins, directed by Stanislavsky, premiered on 5 October 1926. The first Soviet play to portray the White Army officers realistically, not as caricature villains but as likeable people, caused furore. In its first season, in 1926-1927, The Days of the Turbins ran for 108 performances, the most that year for Moscow theatres. Despite numerous attempts at obstruction, it became a huge a hit, especially with the non-party public. The Soviet press panned it, however, but as the time went by, the severity of the criticism increased. In April 1929 the MAT leadership succumbed to the pressure, and the production was canceled.

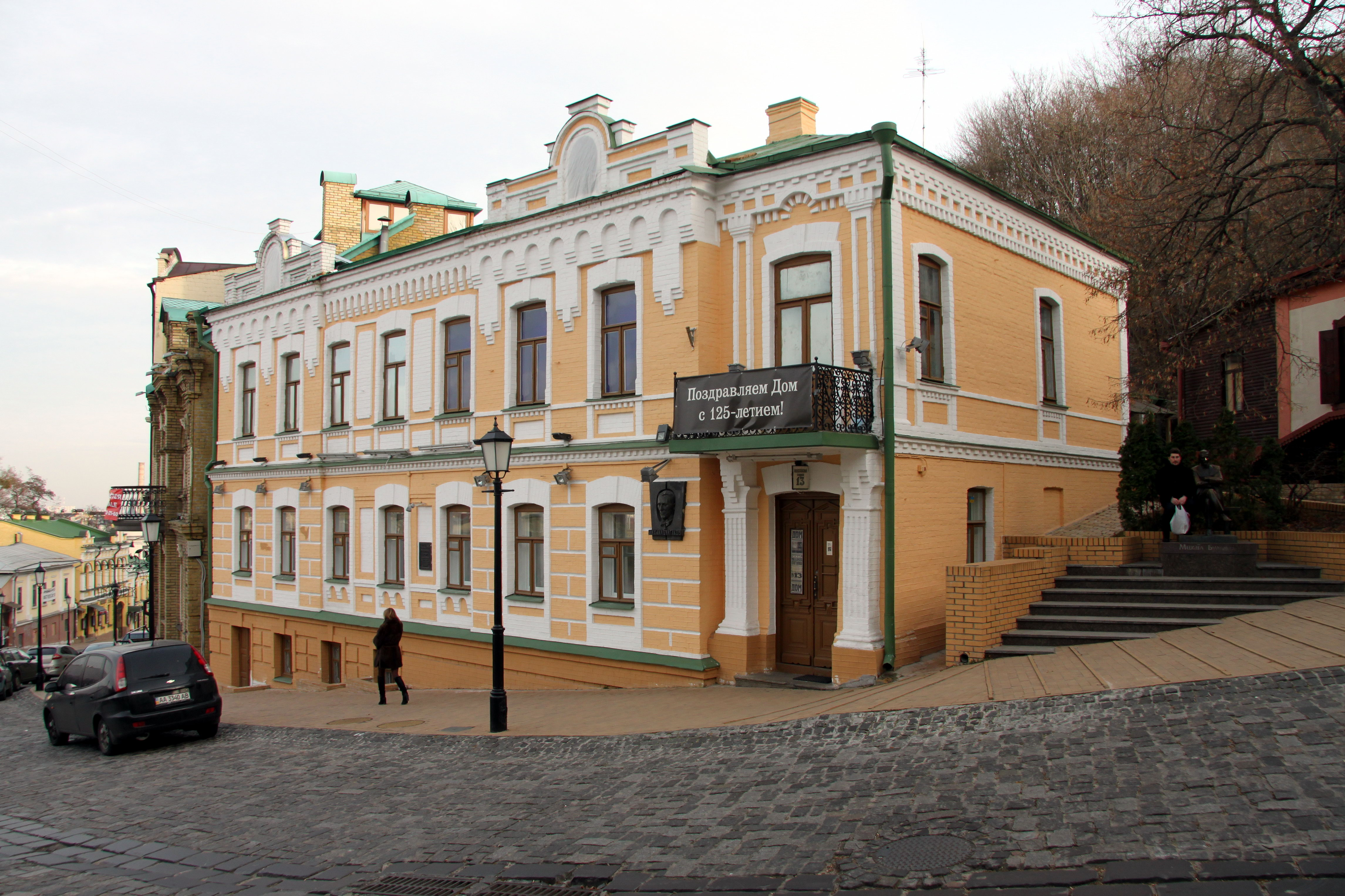
"House of the Turbins", now Bulgakov Museum

On 28 March 1930 Bulgakov sent a letter to the Soviet government to protest the treatment to which the play had been subjected in the Soviet press and mentioned 298 clips of the negative reviews that he had collected. He insisted that his aim was "to portray the intelligentsia, our country's finest social strata. In particular, to show, in the War and Peace tradition, one single family of intelligentsia, belonging to the dvoryanstvo, which, by the will of history itself had been thrown into the White Guard camp. Such [artistic move] is natural for a writer who himself comes from the intelligentsia." His letter remained unanswered, but on 18 April, soon after Vladimir Mayakovsky's suicide, Bulgakov received a telephone call from Stalin, who promised support and asked the author not to think of leaving the Soviet Union.

Bulgakov sent Stalin some more letters. They remained unanswered, but on 16 February 1932, unexpectedly, the production of the Days of the Turbins was revived, and the play re-entered the Moscow Art Theatre's major repertoire. For Bulgakov, that came as a surprise. "For reasons unknown to me, which I am not in a position to speculate upon, the Soviet government issued an extraordinary order for the MAT to re-start the production of The Days of the Turbins. For the author of that play this means only one thing: the huge bulk of his life has been risen from the dead, simple as that," Bulgakov wrote to his friend, the literary and philosophy historian Pavel Popov (1892-1964).

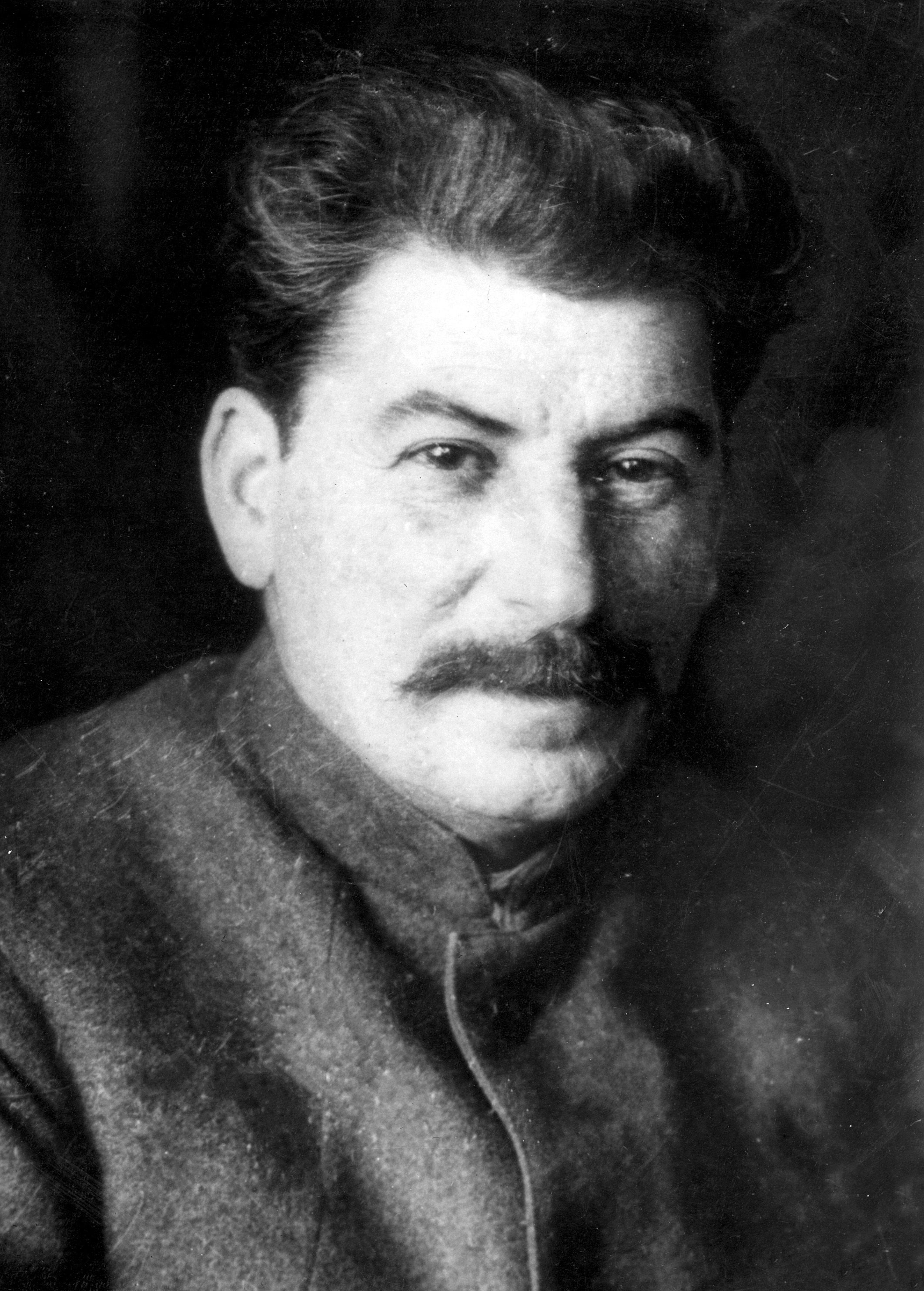
Joseph Stalin's personal interference in 1932 led to restarting the production and, arguably, saved Bulgakov's life during the years of the Great Purge.

It was obvious for both that the "extraordinary" order could not have been issued by any one other than Stalin himself. Later, it was revealed that the Soviet leader had seen the play at least 15 times in the course of three years and often visited the theatre incognito. Apparently, Stalin came to such a decision spontaneously upon having returned from the Moscow Art Theatre and being disgusted with what he called "a bad play," Alexander Afinogenov's Fear (tellingly, he criticized the idea that the old intelligentsia should be integrated into the new Soviet society, and it was quite popular with the party-controlled media), and he impulsively decided that the "good one," The Days of the Turbins, should be restored. His orders were promptly heeded.

Stalin himself tried to downplay his own infatuation with the Days of the Turbins and its MAT production. In a letter to Vladimir Bill-Belotserkovski dated 2 February 1929, he argued, "The play does more good than harm. Mind you, the general impression which the viewer leaves the theatre with, is that of the Bolsheviks' victory. That the likes of the Turbins decide to lay down the arms and succumb to the will of the people, conceding the defeat, could mean only one thing: that the Bolsheviks are invincible." Such a line of argument served as a red herring for Stalin, the critic Marianna Shaternikova argued, for "there was nothing in the play which might have been interpreted even as a hint at Bolshevism's invincibility. What there was instead is the all-pervading sense of total betrayal... as the White Army generals, the Hetman, the Germans and all those whom they considered friends or allies, abandoning [the Turbins]." A small detail found in the diaries of Elena Bulgakova shows how deeply moved the Soviet leader had been by the play. "You perform Alexey so good! Your Turbin's small mustachios even visit me in my dreams, I cannot forget them," he told the MAT actor Nikolai Khmelyov.

== Major characters ==
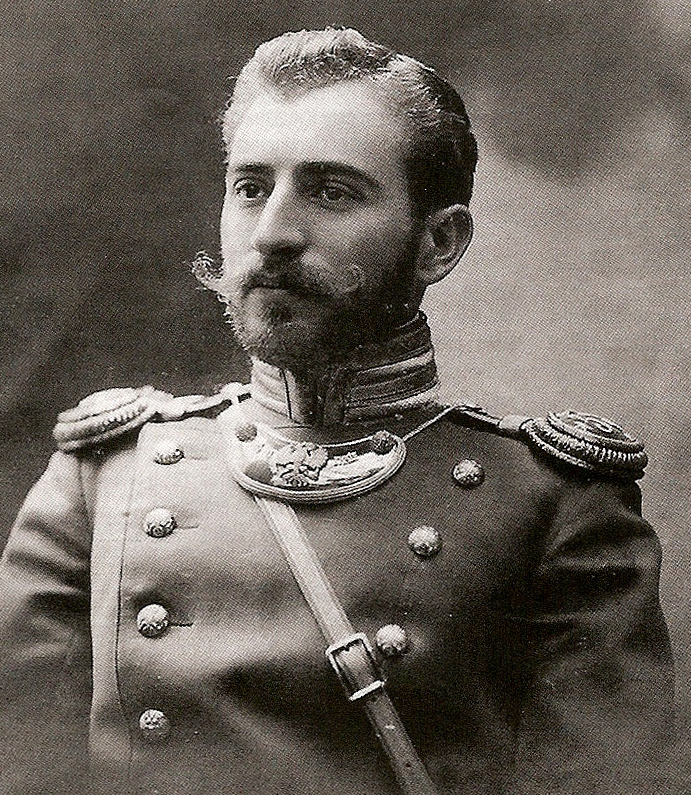
The real-life Bolbotun, Pyotr Bolbochan

- Alexey Vasilyevich Turbin, the artillery colonel, 30
- Nikolai Turbin, his brother, 18
- Elena Vasilyena Talberg, their sister, 24
- Vladimir Robertovich Talberg, the White Army headquarters colonel, her husband, 38
- Viktor Viktorovich Myshlayevsky, artillery captain, 38
- Leonid Yuryevich Shervinsky, poruchik (lieutenant), Skoropadskyi's adjutant
- Alexander Bronislavovich Studzinsky, captain, 29
- Lariosik, Alexey's cousin from Zhytomyr, 21
- Pavlo Skoropadsky, hetman of Ukraine
- Bolbotun, Symon Petliura's First Cavalry Division commander
- Galanba, Uragan, Kirpaty, soldiers of Petliura's army
- Von Schratt, German general,
- Von Doust, German army major.

== Summary ==
Kiev of the late 1918 to early 1919 is a city in chaos. Firstly, Hetman Pavlo Skoropadskyi's regime falls. Then, it is succeeded by the Directorate of Ukraine. Next, Symon Petliura comes in. Finally, he is ousted from the city by the Bolsheviks.

The Turbins are a family caught in the turmoil by suffering their own tragedies, watching their whole world crash by the mindless violence, and feeling abandoned and betrayed. Colonel Alexey Turbin and his brother Nikolai remain loyal to the White movement and are determined to give their lives for it. Elena's husband, Colonel Talberg, flees the city with the German troops. Despite horrors and uncertainty, the family gathers to celebrate New Year's Day.

== Publication history ==
The Days of the Turbins was published for the first time in Russian in 1955, in Moscow under Elena Bulgakova's personal supervision. In 1934, in Boston and New York City, the play had come out in English and been translated by Y. Lyons and F. Bloch, respectively. In 1927, its second version had been translated into German by K. Rosenberg.

== Production history ==
The Days of the Turbins premiered on 5 October 1926 in Moscow Art Theatre and as directed by Konstantin Stanislavsky and codirected by Ilya Sudakov (1890-1969). The cast included Nikolai Khmelyov as Alexey Turbin, Ivan Kudryavtsev as Nikolka, Vera Sokolova as Elena, Mark Prudkin as Shervinsky (his song has been performed for several years by the Bolshoi Theatre opera singer Pyotr Selivanov), Evgeny Kaluzhsky as Studzinsky, Boris Dobronravov as Myshlayevsky, Vsevolod Verbitsky as Talberg, Mikhail Yanshin as Lariosik, Viktor Stanitsyn as Von Shratt, Robert Schilling as Von Dust, Vladimir Ershov as Getman, Nikolai Titushin as the deserter, Alexander Anders as Bolbotun and Mikhail Kedrov as Maxim.

The play enjoyed an enormous success. Bulgakov's secretary, I.S. Raaben, who had typed the novel The White Guard and had been personally invited to the theatre by Bulgakov, remembered, "That was astounding. All these things were still very much alive in the people's memories. There were fits of hysteria, people fainted, seven people were driven away by ambulance, for there were lots of people in the audience who had come through the Petlyura horrors, and all those Civil War hardships."

The publicist Ivan Solonevich remembered an episode in which the White Army officers on stage after having drunk some vodka, were supposed sing the anthem "God Save the Tsar!" in a ramshackle and disheartened manner. "Then something inexplicable happened. The whole audience started to rise to their feet. The actors' voices strengthened. People were standing and silently weeping. Next to me, an old worker, my Party chief, rose up too. He later tried helplessly to rationalize what had happened. I helped him by saying that was mass hypnosis. But that was something much more than that.... The directors received the orders to stage the episode in such a way so as to make it look derogatory, and the rendition insulting for Old Russia's hymn. For some reason they failed to do so and that proved to be the reason that the production was finally canceled."

In April 1929, the production was canceled. On 16 February 1932, the direct interference of Stalin had it was revived, and it continued to run until June 1941. The play had 987 runs in the course of those ten years.

== Critical response ==
Throughout its first three years in the MAT, the play was severely criticised in the Soviet press, with numerous celebrities like Vladimir Mayakovsky, joining the chorus of detractors. Education Ministre Anatoly Lunacharsky, writing for Izvestia on 8 October 1926, insisted that the play amounted to the apology of the White movement. Later, in 1933 he called it "the drama of a restricted, sly even, capitulation". Novy Zritel ("Modern Viewer"), on 2 February 1927, described it as the "cynical attempt to idealize the White Army".

What seemed to enrage the critics most was that the White Army officers in the play were portrayed almost as Chekhov-type characters. The future Glavrepertkom (censorship board for plats) chief O. Litkovsky (1892-1971) called the play "the Cherry Orchard of the White movement" and asked rhetorically, "The sufferings of the landowner Ranevskaya, who is about to have her cherry orchard ruthlessly axed, what bearings do they have for the Soviet theatre-goers? And should we care for the nostalgia suffered by immigrants, either external or internal, for the White movement, so timelessly deceased?"

The only review that could be said to be positive was that of N. Rukavishnikov in Komsomolskaya Pravda who, replying to the poet Alexander Bezymensky, who had called Bulgakov "the neo-bourgeous scum", argued that "now, as we are approaching the 10th anniversary of the October Revolution... it is quite safe to portray [the 'white' officers] in a more realistic manner," and "the viewer has had enough of the agitprop-spawned hairy priests and fat capitalists in bowler hats."

Bulgakov's play's secret admirer, however, proved to be Stalin, who admittedly watched the play in MAT at least 15 times and invariably spoke of it in rapturous terms, according to Valery Shanayev, who also mentioned that there were several Bulgakov's books in the Soviet leader's Kremlin library. It was Stalin's personal orders that caused the play to be reinstalled, and it soon became part of what was known as the MAT's major repertoire.

Modern critics consider the play the peak of Bulgakov's development as a playwright and a 20th-century drama classic.
