= Pushkin (disambiguation) =

Alexander Pushkin (1799–1837) was a Russian poet.

Pushkin may also refer to:

== Places ==
- Pushkin, Saint Petersburg, a town in Pushkinsky District of Saint Petersburg, Russia
- Pushkin Airport, an airfield near Saint Petersburg, Russia
- Biləsuvar, Azerbaijan, formerly Pushkin
- Pushkin (Tashkent Metro), a railway station in Tashkent, Uzbekistan
- Pushkin High School, in Berezniki, Russia
- Pushkin Park, in Saransk, Mordovia, Russia
- Pushkin Street, the main street of Kazan, Russia

== People with the surname ==
- Aleksei Musin-Pushkin (1744–1817), Russian statesman, historian, and art collector
- Valentin Musin-Pushkin (1735–1804), Russian military officer and government official
- Ales Pushkin (1965–2023), Belarusian artist, performer, and political prisoner
- Alexander Pushkin (ballet dancer) (1907–1970), Russian ballet master
- Apollo Mussin-Pushkin (1760–1805), Russian chemist and plant collector
- Boris Pushkin (c. 1590–1659), Russian diplomat and officeholder
- Georgy Pushkin (1909–1963), Soviet ambassador and politician
- Mike Pushkin, American politician
- Natalia Pushkina (1812–1863), Alexander Pushkin's wife
- Vasily Pushkin (1766–1830), Russian poet and Alexander Pushkin's uncle

== Fictional characters ==
- Rocket Red (Dmitri Pushkin), DC Comics superhero
- General Pushkin, the head of the KGB in the 1987 film The Living Daylights
- Vladimir Pushkin, the main antagonist in the 2014 film The Equalizer

== Other uses ==
- Pushkin: The Last Duel, a 2006 Russian film
- Pushkin Industries, an American podcast and audiobook publisher
- Pushkin Institute, a Russian-language education center in Moscow
- Pushkin Museum, a fine arts museum in Moscow
- Pushkin Press, a British-based publishing house
- Pushkin Prize, a Russian literary prize
- Alexander Pushkin (Bourganov), a statue in Washington D.C., US
- Alexander Pushkin (diamond), a large gem discovered in 1989
- MS Alexandr Pushkin, an ocean liner
- "Pushkin", a 1994 song by Will Oldham from Days in the Wake

== See also ==
- Alexander Pushkin (disambiguation)
- Pushkin House (disambiguation)
- Pushkino (disambiguation)
- Pushkinsky (disambiguation)
