= Alexander Pushkin (disambiguation) =

Alexander Pushkin (1799–1837) was a Russian poet.

Alexander Pushkin may also refer to:

- Alexander Pushkin (ballet dancer) (1907–1970), Russian ballet master
- Alexander Pushkin (diamond), colourless raw diamond found in Russia
- Aleksandr Pushkin, Soviet ocean liner
- Alexander Pushkin (play), a play by Mikhail Bulgakov

== See also ==
- Pushkin (disambiguation)
