= Anatol Vieru =

Romanian composer (1926–1998)

Anatol Vieru (Romanian pronunciation: [anaˈtol viˈeru]; 8 June 1926 – 8 October 1998) was a Romanian music theoretician, pedagogue, and composer. A pupil of Aram Khachaturian, he composed seven symphonies, eight string quartets, concertos, and chamber music. He also wrote three operas: Iona (1976), Praznicul Calicilor (1981), and Telegrame, Temă și Variațiuni (1983). He was awarded the Herder Prize in 1986.

== Biography ==
Vieru was born in Iași. In 1954 he married Nina Shutikova, with whom he had one son and one daughter; his son is the pianist, writer and mathematician Andrei Vieru. He was a conductor at the Bucharest National Theatre from 1947 to 1950, when he became editor of Muzica magazine. Vieru died in Bucharest at age 72.

== List of works ==
=== Dramatic ===
- Iona (opera, 1, after Marin Sorescu and sketches by M.C. Escher), 1972–75, concert performed in Bucharest, 31 October 1976
- Praznicul calicilor [The Feast of the Beggars] (op, after Mihail Sorbul), 1978–80, Berlin, 1991
- Telegrame (mini-opera, after Ion Luca Caragiale), 1983
- Temă cu Variațiuni [Theme and Variations] (mini-opera, after Caragiale), 1983
- Ultimele zile, ultimele ore [The Last Days, the Last Hours] (opera, 3, after Alexander Pushkin: Mozart and Salieri and Mikhail Bulgakov: The Last Days), 1990–95

=== Film scores ===
(Names of directors in parentheses):

- Când primăvara e fierbinte [When Spring is Hot] (Mircea Săucan), 1960
- Ciucurencu (Erich Nussbaum), 1964
- Procesul alb [The White Trial] (Iulian Mihu), 1965
- Brâncuși la Târgu-Jiu [Brâncuși at Târgu-Jiu] (Erich Nussbaum), 1966
- Soarele negru [Black Sun] (Slavomir Popovici), 1968
- O sută de lei [100 Leis] (Mircea Săucan), 1972
- Felix și Otilia [Felix and Otilia] (Iulian Mihu), 1972
- Marele singuratic [The Great Lonesome] (Iulian Mihu), 1976
- Intoarcera lui Vodă Lăpușneanu [Lăpușneanu's Return] (Malvina Urșianu), 1979

=== Orchestral ===
Symphonies:

- no.1 'Oda tăcerii' [Ode to Silence], 1967
- no.2, 1973
- no.3 'La un cutremur' [Earthquake Symphony], 1978
- no.4, 1982
- no.5 (Mihai Eminescu), chorus, orchestra, 1984–85
- no.6 [Exodus], 1989
- no.7 'Annul soarelui calm' [The Year of the Silent Sun], 1992–93

Other:

- Suită în stil vechi [Suite in an Olden Style], for strings, 1945
- Dansuri simfonice, 1952
- Concerto for Orchestra, 1954–55
- Flute Concerto, 1958
- Simfonia de cameră, 1962
- Cello Concerto, 1962
- Jocuri (Jeux), piano, orchestra, 1963
- Violin Concerto, 1964
- Clepsidra I (Sonnenuhr), 1968–69
- Muzeu muzical [Museum Music], harpsichord, 12 strings, 1968
- Screen (Ecran), 1969
- Clarinet Concerto, 1975
- Sinfonietta, 1975
- Concerto for violin, cello and orchestra, 1979
- Sinfonia concertante, cello and orchestra, 1987
- Narration II, sax and orchestra, 1985
- Memorial, 1990
- Psalm, 1993
- Piano Concerto 'Caleidoscop', 1993
- Malincolia furiosa, viola and orchestra, 1994
- Hibernal, panpipes, strings, 1995
- Flute Concerto no.2, 1996
- Guitar Concerto, 1996
- Musik, organ and strings, 1996
- Elegia II, cello, doublebass and chamber orchestra, 1998

=== Vocal ===
Choral:

- Mierla lui Ilie Pintilie [Ilie Pintilie's Blackbrid] (cant.), 1949
- Miorița [Miorița: The Little Ewe Lamb] (oratorio), 1957
- Cantata anilor lumină [Light Years Cântată] (Nina Cassian), 1960
- Scene nocturne (Federico García Lorca), 2 choruses, 1964
- Vocale [Vowels] (Giuseppe Ungaretti), female chorus, 1963
- Clepsidra II (folk texts), chorus, panpipes, cymbal, orchestra, 1971
- Fratele cel sărac [The Poor Brother] (after Ion Neculce), 1993
- Daniil, 1994
- În marea apusului [In the Sea of Sunsets], chorus, trumpet, timpani, 1998

Solo:

- Muzică pentru Bacovia și Labiș [Music for Bacovia and Labiș], 1959–63:
1. The Struggle against Inertia, mezzo-soprano, tenor, flute, violin, piano
2. Nocturnes and Resonances of Bacovia, soprano, flute, piano
3. Truces, mezzo-soprano, piano
- Discul lui Newton [Newton's Disc], 12 solo vv, 1972
- 4 unghiuri din care am văzut Florența [4 Angels to See Florence], soprano, piano/harpsichord, 1–2 percussionists, 1973
- Cântec arhaic de dragoste [Ancient Love Songs] (Bible: Solomon)
  1. Sage mir an, Mez, flute, oboe, clarinet, bassoon, 1985
  2. O that you were a Brother to Me, 8vv, 1987
  3. Siehe, du bist schön, Mez, a sax, 1985
  4. Fă-mă precum o pecete [Set Me as a Seal upon your Heart], 4vv, flute, oboe, clarinet, bassoon, horn, 1989
  5. Ja nartsis saronskij [I am a Rose of Sharon], chorus, 1987;
- Poveste [Marches], Sprechstimme, percussion, 1993
- Archipelagos, baritone, vibraphone, 1994
- Dechanson (Tristan Tzara), 4vv, 1995
- Questions et reponses (Paul Celan, P. Solomon), 4vv, 1995
- Iarba ochilor tăi [The Grass of your Eyes] (Paul Celan), 4vv, 1997

=== Chamber and solo instrumental ===
String quartets:

- no.1, 1955
- no.2, 1956
- no.3, soprano and string quartet, 1973
- no.4, 1980
- no.5, 1982
- no.6, 1986
- no.7, 1987
- no.8, 1991

Other:

- Clarinet Quintet, 1957
- Kammersymphonie, 1962
- Trepte ale tăcerii [Steps of Silence], string quartet, percussion, 1966
- Nautilos, piano, tape, 1969
- Sita lui Eratostene [The Riddle of Eratosthanes], clarinet, violin, viola, cello, piano, 1969
- Nașterea unui limbaj [The Birth of a Language], piano 4 hands, 1971
- Mozaicuri [Mosaics], 3 percussionists, 1972
- Iosif și frații săi [Joseph and his Brothers], 11 instruments, tape, 1979
- Scoica [Shell], 15 strings, 1982
- Double Duos, a sax/b clarinet, vib/mar, 1983
- Ma–jo–r Music, flute, clarinet, harp, string quartet, 1984;
- Metasaks, sax, dea (1984);
- Soroc I, 6 studies, percussion, 1984
- Soroc II, 7 instruments, 1984
- Sonata, violin, cello, 1984–5
- Diaphonie, cello, doublebass, 1987
- Trînta [Wrestling], sax, percussion, 1987;
- Epistolaire, a flute, piano, 1988
- Multigen, a flute, oboe, a sax, percussion, piano, 1988
- Giusto, sax, 2 guitars, synth, percussion, 1989
- Versete [Verses], 1989
- Sax Quartet, 1990
- Sax-Vier, sax quartet, 1991
- Trio microtonic, bassoon, guitar, doublebass, 1992
- Feuerwerk, flute, violin, vibraphone, 1994
- Crăciun [Christmas], violin, piano, 1994
- Canto, oboe, percussion, 1995
- Couple, clarinet, viola, 1995
- Duo leggiero, flute, percussion, 1995
- Rubato, oboe, percussion, 1995
- Toccatina, 2 guitar, 1995
- Chanson de geste, guitar, cello, 1996
- Gruss, violin, cello, piano, organ, 1996
- Masca [Masks], flute, cello, doublebass, 1996
- Canon und Fuge, piano 4 hands, 1997
- Elegia I, sax, organ, 1997
- Et in Arcadia ego, 3 recorders, 1997
- Posviascenie [Dedication], trumpet, cello, timpani, 1997
- Trio, violin, cello, piano, 1997
- Centaurus, sax, trombone, percussion, 1998

Solo:

- Din lumea copiilor [From the Realm of Childhood], 8 miniatures, piano, 1958
- Sonata, cello, 1963, arr. cello, percussion (1977)
- Narration, organ, 1973
- Piano Sonata, 1976
- Pelinarium, synthesizer, 1986
- Dar I [Gift], flute, 1988
- Dar II, cello, 1989
- Design-Dasein, flute+a flute+piccolo, 1993
- Piano Sonata, 1994
- Ritmuri [Rhythms], piano, 1994
- Adio, piano, 1996
- Eppur si muove, flute, 1996
- Sandu, piano, 1996
- Schöntok, piano, 1996
- Capriccio, violin, 1997
- Voeu, piano, 1997
