= Pushkino =

Pushkino may refer to:

- Pushkino, Armenia, an inhabited locality in Armenia
- Pushkino Urban Settlement, a municipal formation which the City of Pushkino in Pushkinsky District of Moscow Oblast, Russia is incorporated as
- Pushkino, Russia, several inhabited localities in Russia
- Pushkino, former name of the city of Biləsuvar in Azerbaijan

== See also ==
- Pushkin (disambiguation)
- Pushkinsky (disambiguation)
