= Russian declension =

Inflection in the Russian language

In Russian grammar, the system of declension is elaborate and complex. Nouns, pronouns, adjectives, demonstratives, most numerals and other particles are declined for two grammatical numbers (singular and plural) and six grammatical cases; some of these parts of speech in the singular are also declined by three grammatical genders (masculine, feminine and neuter). This gives many spelling combinations for most of the words, which is needed for grammatical agreement within and (often) outside the proposition. Also, there are several paradigms for each declension with numerous irregular forms.

Russian has retained more declensions than many other modern Indo-European languages (English, for example, has almost no declensions remaining in the language).

== Nouns ==
Nominal declension comprises six cases – nominative, accusative, genitive, prepositional, dative, instrumental, two numbers (singular and plural), and three grammatical genders (masculine, feminine, and neuter). Up to ten additional cases are identified in linguistics textbooks, although all of them are either incomplete (do not apply to all nouns) or degenerate (appear identical to one of the six simple cases). The most recognized additional cases are locative (в лесу́, на мосту́, в крови́ — in the forest, on the bridge, in (the) blood), partitive (ча́ю, са́хару, коньяку́ — (some) tea, sugar, cognac), and several forms of vocative (Го́споди, Бо́же, о́тче — (O) Lord, God, father). The adjectives, pronouns, and the first two cardinal numbers further vary by gender. Old Russian also had a third number, the dual, but it has been lost except for its use in the nominative and accusative cases with the numbers two, three and four (e.g. два стула [dvɐ ˈstulə], "two chairs", now reanalyzed as genitive singular).

Russian noun cases often replace the usage of prepositions in other Indo-European languages. Their usage can be summarised as:

- Nominative – the “subject” case
- Accusative – the “direct object” case
- Genitive – corresponding to the possessive case or “of + (noun)”
- Prepositional – used with certain prepositions, such as “in”, “on” etc.
- Dative – corresponding to “to + (noun)" or the indirect object
- Instrumental – denoting an instrument used in an action

There are no articles, neither definite nor indefinite (such as the, a, an in English), in the Russian language. The sense of a noun is determined from the context in which it appears. That said, there are some means of expressing whether a noun is definite or indefinite. They are:

- The use of a direct object in the genitive instead of the accusative in negation signifies that the noun is indefinite, compare: "Я не ви́жу кни́ги" ("I don't see a book" or "I don't see any books") and "Я не ви́жу кни́гу" ("I don't see the book").
- The use of the numeral one sometimes signifies that the noun is indefinite, e.g.: "Почему́ ты так до́лго?" – "Да так, встре́тил одного́ дру́га, пришло́сь поговори́ть" ("Why did it take you so long?" – "Well, I met one [=a] friend and had to talk").
- Word order may also be used for this purpose, compare "В ко́мнату вбежа́л ма́льчик" ("Into the room rushed a boy") and "Ма́льчик вбежа́л в ко́мнату" ("The boy rushed into the room").
- The plural form may signify indefiniteness: "Вы мо́жете купи́ть э́то в магази́нах" ("You can buy this in shops") vs. "Вы мо́жете купи́ть э́то в магази́не" ("You can buy this in the shop").

The category of animacy is relevant in Russian nominal and adjectival declension. Specifically, the accusative has two possible forms in many paradigms, depending on the animacy of the referent. For animate referents (sentient species, professions and occupations, human-like toys, most animals), the accusative form is generally identical to the genitive form (genitive-accusative syncretism). For inanimate referents (simple lifeforms, objects, states, notions), the accusative form is identical to the nominative form (nominative-accusative syncretism). This principle is relevant for masculine singular nouns of the second declension (see below) and adjectives, and for all plural paradigms (with no gender distinction). In the tables below, this behavior is indicated by the abbreviation N or G in the row corresponding to the accusative case.

In Russian there are three declensions:

- The first declension is used for feminine nouns ending with -а/-я and some masculine nouns having the same form as those of feminine gender, such as па́па "papa" or дя́дя "uncle"; also there are common-gender nouns like зади́ра "teaser" which are masculine or feminine depending on the person they refer to.
- The second declension is used for most masculine and neuter nouns.
- The third declension is used for feminine nouns ending in ь.

There is also a group of several irregular "different-declension nouns" (Russian: разносклоня́емые существи́тельные), consisting of a few neuter nouns ending in -мя (e.g. вре́мя "time") and one masculine noun путь "way". However, these nouns and their forms have sufficient similarity with feminine third declension nouns that some scholars such as Litnevskaya consider them to be non-feminine forms of this declension, as written in the tables below.

Nouns ending with -ий, -ия, -ие (not to be confused with nominalized adjectives) are written with -ии instead of -ие in Prepositional: тече́ние – в ни́жнем тече́нии реки́ "streaming – in lower streaming of a river". (As none of these endings are ever stressed, due to vowel reduction the pronunciation difference between -ие and -ии may be hardly noticeable in fluent speech.) But if the words в течение and в продолжение are representing compound prepositions meaning "while, during the time of", they are written with -е: в тече́ние ча́са "in the course of an hour". For nouns ending in -ья, -ье, or -ьё, using -ьи in the Prepositional (where endings of some of them are stressed) is usually erroneous, but in poetic speech it may be acceptable (as we replace -ии with -ьи for metric or rhyming purposes): Весь день она́ лежа́ла в забытьи́ (F. Tyutchev).

=== First declension ===
The first declension group belongs to nouns with the ending -а and -я. These nouns are typically feminine, but include masculine nouns that have a feminine ending as well.

	Singular			Plural		
Nominative	-а	-я	-ия	-ы^{1}	-и	-ии
Accusative	-у	-ю	-ию	N or G		
Genitive	-ы^{1}	-и	-ии	–	-ь	-ий
Prepositional	-е		-ии	-ах	-ях	-иях
Dative	-е		-ии	-ам	-ям	-иям
Instrumental	-ой^{2}	-ей^{3}	-ией	-ами	-ями	-иями

1. After a sibilant (ж, ч, ш, щ) or a velar (г, к, or х) consonant, и is written.
2. After a sibilant or ц, о is written when stressed; е when unstressed.
3. After a soft consonant, ё is written when stressed; е when unstressed.

Examples: рабо́та – a work/job, ба́ня – a bathhouse, кни́га – a book, ли́ния – a line

Note: In the instrumental case, -ою and -ею instead of -ой and -ей endings may be encountered in the singular.

	Singular				Plural			
Nominative	рабо́та	ба́ня	кни́га	ли́ния	рабо́ты	ба́ни	кни́ги	ли́нии
Accusative	рабо́ту	ба́ню	кни́гу	ли́нию	рабо́ты	ба́ни	кни́ги	ли́нии
Genitive	рабо́ты	ба́ни	кни́ги	ли́нии	рабо́т	ба́нь	книг	ли́ний
Prepositional	рабо́те	ба́не	кни́ге	ли́нии	рабо́тах	ба́нях	кни́гах	ли́ниях
Dative	рабо́те	ба́не	кни́ге	ли́нии	рабо́там	ба́ням	кни́гам	ли́ниям
Instrumental	рабо́той	ба́ней	кни́гой	ли́нией	рабо́тами	ба́нями	кни́гами	ли́ниями

=== Second declension – masculine nouns ===
Nouns ending in a consonant are marked in the following table with – (thus no ending).

	Singular				Plural			
Nominative	–	-ь	-й	-ий	-ы^{1}	-и^{5}		-ии
Accusative	N or G				N or G			
Genitive	-а	-я		-ия	-ов^{2}	-ей	-ев^{3}	-иев
Prepositional	-е			-ии	-ах	-ях		-иях
Dative	-у	-ю		-ию	-ам	-ям		-иям
Instrumental	-ом^{4}	-ем^{3}		-ием	-ами	-ями		-иями

Notes:

1. After a sibilant (ж, ч, ш, щ) or a velar (г, к, or х) consonant, и is written. Some words have the stressed ending а (глаз — глаза́, доктор — доктора́, etc.).
2. After a sibilant, ей is written.
3. After a soft consonant, ё is written when stressed; е when unstressed.
4. After a sibilant or ц, о is written when stressed; е when unstressed.
5. Some words have the stressed ending я (я́корь — якоря́, etc.).

Examples: фильм – a film/movie, писа́тель – a writer, геро́й – a hero, коммента́рий – a comment

	Singular				Plural			
Nominative	фи́льм	писа́тель	геро́й	коммента́рий	фи́льмы	писа́тели	геро́и	коммента́рии
Accusative	фи́льм	писа́теля	геро́я	коммента́рий	фи́льмы	писа́телей	геро́ев	коммента́рии
Genitive	фи́льма	писа́теля	геро́я	коммента́рия	фи́льмов	писа́телей	геро́ев	коммента́риев
Prepositional	фи́льме	писа́теле	геро́е	коммента́рии	фи́льмах	писа́телях	геро́ях	коммента́риях
Dative	фи́льму	писа́телю	геро́ю	коммента́рию	фи́льмам	писа́телям	геро́ям	коммента́риям
Instrumental	фи́льмом	писа́телем	геро́ем	коммента́рием	фи́льмами	писа́телями	геро́ями	коммента́риями

=== Second declension – neuter nouns ===
Nouns ending in -о and -е are neuter.

	Singular		Plural	
Nominative	-о^{1}	-е^{2}	-а	-я
Accusative	-о^{1}	-е^{2}	N or G	
Genitive	-а	-я	–	-й / -ей^{4}
Prepositional	-е	-е^{3}	-ах	-ях
Dative	-у	-ю	-ам	-ям
Instrumental	-ом^{1}	-ем^{2}	-ами	-ями

1. After a sibilant or ц, о is written when stressed; е when unstressed.
2. After a soft consonant, ё is written when stressed; е when unstressed.
3. For nouns ending in ие in the nominative singular, и is written (but е when stressed — for the word остриё).
4. After a consonant use ей otherwise use й.
5. Also: some masculine nouns ending in -о in the nominative singular (доми́шко, diminutive from дом 'house'); there is only one masculine noun ending in -е in this declension: подмасте́рье.

Examples ме́сто – a place, мо́ре – a sea, зда́ние – a building

	Singular			Plural		
Nominative	ме́сто	мо́ре	зда́ние	места́	моря́	зда́ния
Accusative	ме́сто	мо́ре	зда́ние	места́	моря́	зда́ния
Genitive	ме́ста	мо́ря	зда́ния	мест	море́й	зда́ний
Prepositional	ме́сте	мо́ре	зда́нии	места́х	моря́х	зда́ниях
Dative	ме́сту	мо́рю	зда́нию	места́м	моря́м	зда́ниям
Instrumental	ме́стом	мо́рем	зда́нием	места́ми	моря́ми	зда́ниями

=== Third declension ===
The third declension is for predominantly feminine nouns, or with a non-standard termination as shown with exceptional words: дитя ('child', archaic) and путь ('path').

	Singular				Plural			
	Feminine	Neuter		Masculine	Feminine	Neuter		Masculine
Nominative	-ь	-мя	дитя́	путь	-и	-мена	де́ти	пути́
Accusative	-ь	-мя	дитя́	путь	N or G	-мена	дете́й	пути́
Genitive	-и	-мени	дитя́ти	пути́	-ей	-мён(-мян)	дете́й	путе́й
Prepositional	-и	-мени	дитя́ти	пути́	-ях^{1}	-менах	де́тях	путя́х
Dative	-и	-мени	дитя́ти	пути́	-ям^{1}	-менам	де́тям	путя́м
Instrumental	-ью	-менем	дитя́тей	путём	-я́ми^{1} (ьми́)	-менами	детьми́	путя́ми

1. After a sibilant, а is written.

Examples: кость (f) – a bone, мышь (f) – a mouse, и́мя (n) – a name

	Singular			Plural		
Nominative	ко́сть	мы́шь	и́мя	ко́сти	мы́ши	имена́
Accusative	ко́сть	мы́шь	и́мя	ко́сти	мыше́й	имена́
Genitive	ко́сти	мы́ши	и́мени	косте́й	мыше́й	имён
Prepositional	ко́сти	мы́ши	и́мени	костя́х	мыша́х	имена́х
Dative	ко́сти	мы́ши	и́мени	костя́м	мыша́м	имена́м
Instrumental	ко́стью	мы́шью	и́менем	костя́ми	мыша́ми	имена́ми

=== Irregular plural forms ===
There are various kinds of irregularities in forming plurals. Some words have an irregular plural form, but a few use suppletion, being substituted by a different root altogether. Historically, some of these irregularities come from older declensional patterns that have become mostly obsolete in modern Russian.

Singular	Plural
Change of root/ suppletion
ребёнок (m) – child	де́ти
челове́к (m) – human	лю́ди
ёнок → я́та for animals' children
ребёнок (m) – child	ребя́та
телёнок (m) – calf	теля́та
волчо́нок (m) – wolf cub	волча́та
Old imparisyllabic nouns (suffix is added)
чу́до (n) – miracle	чудеса́
не́бо (n) – sky	небеса́
мать (f) – mother	ма́тери
дочь (f) – daughter	до́чери
сын (m) – son	сыновья́ (also сыны́ in certain cases)
кум (m) – godfather	кумовья́
Remnants of the dual number
коле́но (n) – knee	коле́ни
плечо́ (n) – shoulder	пле́чи
у́хо (n) – ear	у́ши
ве́ко (n) – eyelid	ве́ки
я́блоко (n) – apple	я́блоки
Plural in -ья/ья́
брат (m) – brother	бра́тья
брус (m) – baulk, timber	бру́сья
граф (m) – count	гра́фы/графья́ (depreciative)
гроздь (f) – bunch	гро́здья
де́верь (m) – brother-in-law	деверья́
де́рево (n) – tree	дере́вья
дно (n) – bottom	до́нья
друг (m) – friend	друзья́
звено́ (n) – link	зве́нья
зять (m) – son-in-law	зятья́
клин (m) – wedge	кли́нья
клок (m) – shred, scrap	кло́чья
князь (m) – prince	князья́
кол (m) – stake	ко́лья
ко́лос (m) – ear of a plant	коло́сья
крыло́ (n) – wing	кры́лья
лист (m) – leaf	ли́стья^{1}
муж (m) – husband	мужья́
перо́ (n) – feather	пе́рья
поле́но (n) – log	поле́нья
по́лоз (m) – runner, coluber	поло́зья/по́лозы
помело́ (n) – broom	поме́лья
прут (m) – twig	пру́тья
собра́т (m) – confrere, fellow	собра́тья
струп (m) – scab	стру́пья
стул (m) – chair	сту́лья
сук (m) – branch	су́чья (branches, as a collective noun) суки́ (several individual branches)
ши́ло (m) – awl	ши́лья
шу́рин (m) – brother-in-law	шурья́/шу́рины
-но / -а́
су́дно (n) – ship	суда́
Loses a suffix
цвето́к (m) – flower	цветы́ (flowers, as a collective noun) цветки́ (several individual flowers)
Others
хозя́ин (m) – owner, host	хозя́ева
сосе́д (m) – neighbor	сосе́ди

1. If the word лист has the lexical meaning "sheet (of paper, metal, etc)", then its declension is normal (лист → листы). If it has lexical meaning "leaf (of a tree)", its declension is лист → листья.

=== Indeclinable nouns ===
Some nouns (such as borrowings from other languages, abbreviations, etc.) are not modified when they change number and case. This appears mostly when their gender appears to have no ending in any declension which suits the final part of the word: these are masculine names on vowels different from -а/-я, female names on hard consonants (names like Триш "Trish" will not take the soft sign to go into the third declension like native мышь "mouse"). Most borrowed words ending in Russian in э/е, и, о, у and stressed а are not declined: кафе, пальто (French: paletot), Дюма etc. Most abbreviations are undeclined (one exception is вуз). The name Бангладеш is also undeclined, despite ending on a consonant.

Many people also think that Georgian surnames on -ия like Данелия (Georgian: დანელია) shouldn't be declined since they are originally something like Russian possessive genitives.

=== Personal names ===
Traditionally, a full Russian name consists of a person name (и́мя – given name or first name), patronym (о́тчество – father's name as middle name) and a family name (фами́лия – surname or last name). All of these words have the same grammatical gender as biological one. Slavic, as well as Greek, Roman, Jewish and other person names of European or Semitic origin loaned centuries ago, have gender-specific versions of respective patronyms. To produce a patronym, suffixes -вич- and -вн- are used with final vowel addition or modification: -о for hard consonant (Петро́вич/Петро́вна ⇐ son/daughter of Пётр), -ье for -ий (Григо́рьевич/Григо́рьевна ⇐ Григо́рий), and -е for other cases (Матве́евич/Матве́евна ⇐ Матве́й, И́горевич/И́горевна ⇐ И́горь). Some person names also have versions for both males and females (Алекса́ндр – Алекса́ндра, Евге́ний – Евге́ния).

Additionally, Slavic names have short forms, usually meant for affectionate calls (Ива́н – Ва́ня, А́нна – А́ня; equivalent of Johnny, Annie, etc.). Short forms by themselves can form "reemerging" vocative case (sometimes called neo-vocative); it is used for calling a familiar person, substituting nominative singular by removing last vowel (Артём – Тёма – Тём, О́льга – О́ля – Оль). For this reason, neo-vocative is not possible for male names that can't produce short forms with a final vowel (including some popular ones: Влади́мир, Вита́лий, И́горь). Likewise, there is a neo-vocative form for close relatives: мать – ма́ма – мам (mother – mommy – mom), оте́ц – па́па – пап (father – daddy – dad). When replacing nominative plural (used for always plural nouns), it can be used for collective calls: ребя́та ("guys, lads") – ребя́т, девча́та ("gals") – девча́т.

Most family names in Russia are also gender-specific (shown below in male/female pairs) and declinable like most words (including plural form to denote a married couple or a whole family, as "The Smiths"). They can be divided in these categories (sorted by occurrence):

- Russian origin, gender-specific, declinable as nouns: -о́в/-о́ва (unstressed for names four of more syllables long), -ев/-ева, -ёв/ёва, -и́н/-ина́ (sometimes stressed for names two syllables long);
- Russian origin, gender-agnostic, indeclinable: -ы́х, -и́х;
- Ukrainian origin, gender-specific, declinable as adjectives: -ый/-ая, -о́й/-а́я;
- Ukrainian or Belarusian origin, gender-agnostic, indeclinable: -е́нко (mostly stressed), -ко́;
- Ukrainian or Belarusian origin, gender-agnostic, declinable as masculine nouns for males and indeclinable for females: -у́к, -ю́к, -и́к, -е́ц, etc.;
- Other Slavic origin, gender-specific, declinable as adjectives: -ский/-ская, -цкий/-цкая;
- Other Slavic or non-Slavic origin, gender-agnostic, declinable as masculine nouns for males and indeclinable for females: -о́вич, -е́вич, -ер, -ман, -берг, etc.

Examples:

	male	female	family or couple
Nominative	Ю́рий Алексе́евич Гага́рин	Валенти́на Ива́новна Гага́рина	Гага́рины
Accusative	Юрия Алексеевича Гагарина	Валентину Ивановну Гагарину	Гагариных
Genitive	Юрия Алексеевича Гагарина	Валентины Ивановны Гагариной	Гагариных
Prepositional	Юрии Алексеевиче Гагарине	Валентине Ивановне Гагариной	Гагариных
Dative	Юрию Алексеевичу Гагарину	Валентине Ивановне Гагариной	Гагариным
Instrumental	Юрием Алексеевичем Гагариным	Валентиной Ивановной Гагариной	Гагариными

Here male name is composed of 2nd declension nouns, but there are exceptional endings for Instrumental (patronym: -ем, not -ом; family name: -ым, not -ом). Female name is in 1st declension, but ending -ой is used for a family name in all oblique cases. Plural follows adjectival declension, except that Nominative is short -ы.

== Adjectives ==
A Russian adjective (и́мя прилага́тельное) is usually placed before the noun it qualifies, and it agrees with the noun in case, gender, and number. With the exception of a few invariant forms borrowed from other languages, such as беж 'beige' or ха́ки 'khaki', (Note: These are adjectives and not adverbs, since they can't modify verbs.) most adjectives follow one of a small number of regular declension patterns, except for some which provide difficulty in forming the short form. In modern Russian, the short form appears only in the nominative and is used when the adjective is in a predicative role; formerly (as in the bylinas) short adjectives appeared in all other forms and roles, which are not used in modern language, but are nonetheless understandable to Russian speakers as they are declined exactly like nouns of the corresponding gender.

Adjectives may be divided into three general groups:

- Qualitative (ка́чественные) — denote quality of the object; only adjectives in this group generally have degrees of comparison.
- Relational (относи́тельные) — denote some sort of relationship; unlikely to act as a predicate or have a short form.
- Possessive (притяжа́тельные) — denote belonging to a specific subject; have some declensional peculiarities.

=== Adjectival declension ===
The pattern described below matches the full forms of most adjectives, except possessive ones; it is also used for nominalized adjectives as учёный and for adjectival participles.

	Singular			Plural
	Masc.	Neut.	Fem.	Plural
Nominative	-ый	-ое	-ая	-ые
Accusative	N or G	-ое	-ую	N or G
Genitive	-ого		-ой	-ых
Prepositional	-ом		-ой	-ых
Dative	-ому		-ой	-ым
Instrumental	-ым		-ой	-ыми

1. After a sibilant or velar consonant, и, instead of ы, is written.
2. When a masculine adjective ends in -ой, the -ой is stressed.
3. After a sibilant consonant, neuter adjectives end in ее. This is sometimes called the хорошее rule.
4. Accusative in the masculine singular, and in the plural for all genders, depends on animacy, as for nouns.
5. Instrumental feminine ending -ой/ей for all adjectives has alternative form -ою/ею, which differs only stylistically from the standard form.

Russian differentiates between hard-stem (as above) and soft-stem adjectives. Note the following:

- Masculine adjectives ending in the nominative in ий and neuters in ее are declined as follows: его (read: ево), ему, им, and ем.
- Feminine adjectives in яя are declined ей and юю.
- Plural adjectives in ие are declined их, им, ими and их.
- Case endings -ого/-его are to be read as -ово/ево.

Examples:

но́вый – new
	Singular			Plural
	Masc.	Neut.	Fem.	Plural
Nominative	но́вый	но́вое	но́вая	но́вые
Accusative	N or G	но́вое	но́вую	N or G
Genitive	но́вого		но́вой	но́вых
Prepositional	но́вом		но́вой	но́вых
Dative	но́вому		но́вой	но́вым
Instrumental	но́вым		но́вой	но́выми

си́ний – blue
	Singular			Plural
	Masc.	Neut.	Fem.	Plural
Nominative	си́ний	си́нее	си́няя	си́ние
Accusative	N or G	си́нее	си́нюю	N or G
Genitive	си́него		си́ней	си́них
Prepositional	си́нем		си́ней	си́них
Dative	си́нему		си́ней	си́ним
Instrumental	си́ним		си́ней	си́ними

высо́кий – tall
	Singular			Plural
	Masc.	Neut.	Fem.	Plural
Nominative	высо́кий	высо́кое	высо́кая	высо́кие
Accusative	N or G	высо́кое	высо́кую	N or G
Genitive	высо́кого		высо́кой	высо́ких
Prepositional	высо́ком		высо́кой	высо́ких
Dative	высо́кому		высо́кой	высо́ким
Instrumental	высо́ким		высо́кой	высо́кими

хоро́ший – good
	Singular			Plural
	Masc.	Neut.	Fem.	Plural
Nominative	хоро́ший	хоро́шее	хоро́шая	хоро́шие
Accusative	N or G	хоро́шее	хоро́шую	N or G
Genitive	хоро́шего		хоро́шей	хоро́ших
Prepositional	хоро́шем		хоро́шей	хоро́ших
Dative	хоро́шему		хоро́шей	хоро́шим
Instrumental	хоро́шим		хоро́шей	хоро́шими

большо́й – big
	Singular			Plural
	Masc.	Neut.	Fem.	Plural
Nominative	большо́й	большо́е	больша́я	больши́е
Accusative	N or G	большо́е	большу́ю	N or G
Genitive	большо́го		большо́й	больши́х
Prepositional	большо́м		большо́й	больши́х
Dative	большо́му		большо́й	больши́м
Instrumental	больши́м		большо́й	больши́ми

Before 1917, adjectival declension looked quite different, at least in writing; for example, there were special feminine plural forms, as in French. In modern editions of classical poetry some elements of this system are still used if they are important for rhyme or metrics. A notable example is ending -ыя (bisyllabic) instead of -ой (monosyllabic) for genitive single female adjectives, which were considered bookish and deprecated even in the times of Alexander Pushkin but were still used by him in lines such as «тайна брачныя постели» («Евгений Онегин», IV, L).

=== Comparison of adjectives ===
Comparison forms are usual only for qualitative adjectives and adverbs. Comparative and superlative synthetic forms are not part of the paradigm of original adjectives but are different lexical items, since not all qualitative adjectives have them. A few adjectives have irregular forms that are declined like ordinary adjectives: большо́й 'big' — бо́льший 'bigger', хоро́ший 'good' — лу́чший 'better'. Most synthetically derived comparative forms are derived by adding -ее or -ей to the adjective stem: кра́сный 'red' — красне́е 'more red'; distinguishing such adjectives from the comparative adverbs whose forms they share is at best difficult, if not impossible. Superlative synthetic forms are derived by adding suffix -ейш- or -айш- and additionally sometimes prefix наи-, or using a special comparative form with наи-: до́брый 'kind' — добре́йший 'the kindest', большо́й 'big' — наибо́льший 'the biggest'.

Another method of indicating comparison uses analytical forms with adverbs бо́лее 'more' / ме́нее 'less' and са́мый 'most' / наибо́лее 'most' / наиме́нее 'least': до́брый 'kind' — бо́лее до́брый 'kinder' — са́мый до́брый 'the kindest'. This pattern is rarely used if special comparative forms exist.

=== Possessive adjectives ===
Possessive adjectives are used in Russian to a lesser extent than in most other Slavic languages, but are still in use. They answer the questions чей? чья? чьё? чьи? (whose?) and denote only animated possessors. Alternative for possessive adjectives are possessive genitives which are used much more commonly. There are three suffixes to form them: -ов/ев, -ын/ин and -ий.

Suffix -ов/ев is used to form adjective from a word denoting single human which is masculine and ends on consonant; selection depends on if the stem is hard or soft. Suffix -ын/ин is similar but is attached to feminine words or masculine ending in -а/я. Both types are more common in spoken language than in literary (though being acceptable in both styles) and generally are forms of kinship terms, given names and their diminutives: ма́ма — ма́мин 'mom's', оте́ц — отцо́в 'father's', Са́ша — Са́шин 'Sasha's' /for diminutives from both Alexandr and Alexandra/. Words of this type also are common as Russian surnames, like Пушкин (derived from пу́шка 'gun' which used to be a nickname).

Adjectives on -ов and -ин are declined via mixed declension: some of their forms are nominal, some are adjectival, and some are ambivalent.

ма́мин – mom's
	Singular			Plural
	Masc.	Neut.	Fem.	Plural
Nominative	ма́мин	ма́мино	ма́мина	ма́мины
Accusative	N or G	ма́мино	ма́мину	N or G
Genitive	ма́миного, ма́мина		ма́миной	ма́миных
Prepositional	ма́мином		ма́миной	ма́миных
Dative	ма́миному, ма́мину		ма́миной	ма́миным
Instrumental	ма́миным		ма́миной	ма́миными

Adjectives on -ий (speaking about suffix, not case ending; before vowels, this suffix deceases to single sound /j/ and is written as ь) are used for deriving adjectives mostly from animal species (in Old Russian language, this suffix derived possessive adjectives from plural possessors): лиса 'fox' — лисий 'of a fox', 'likely for a fox'. Declension of such adjectives is nominal in nominative and accusative (except masculine and plural animated accusative) and adjectival for other forms.

ли́сий – fox's
	Singular			Plural
	Masc.	Neut.	Fem.	Plural
Nominative	ли́сий	ли́сье	ли́сья	ли́сьи
Accusative	N or G	ли́сье	ли́сью	N or G
Genitive	ли́сьего		ли́сьей	ли́сьих
Prepositional	ли́сьем		ли́сьей	ли́сьих
Dative	ли́сьему		ли́сьей	ли́сьим
Instrumental	ли́сьим		ли́сьей	ли́сьими

There exist many stable expressions which include possessive adjectives following either of the two declensions shown above: но́ев ковче́г (Noah's Ark, from Ной "Noah"), эвкли́дова геоме́трия (Euclidean geometry, from Эвкли́д "Euclides"), ма́рсово по́ле (the Field of Mars), а́вгиевы коню́шни (the Augean stables, from А́вгий "Augeas"), во́лчий аппети́т (a wolfish appetite, from волк "wolf"), крокоди́ловы слёзы (crocodile tears, from крокоди́л "crocodile"), ка́ждый бо́жий день (every God-given day, from Бог "God"), etc. Notice how the latter two differ from the general rule: крокоди́лов has -ов ending as if a crocodile were a male human, and бо́жий has -ий ending as if God is treated as an animal or (in Old Russian) a crowd (perhaps, symbolizing Holy Trinity).

== Pronouns ==
=== Personal pronouns ===
	Singular					Plural			Reflexive
	1st	2nd	3rd			1st	2nd	3rd	Reflexive
	1st	2nd	Neut.	Masc.	Fem.	1st	2nd	3rd	Reflexive
English	I / me	you	it	he / him	she / her	we / us	you	they / them	-self
Nominative	я	ты	оно́	он	она́	мы	вы	они́	сам
Accusative	меня́	тебя́	(н)его́		(н)её	нас	вас	(н)их	себя́
Genitive	меня́	тебя́	(н)его́		(н)её	нас	вас	(н)их	себя́
Prepositional	мне	тебе́	нём		ней	нас	вас	них	себе́
Dative	мне	тебе́	(н)ему́		(н)ей	нам	вам	(н)им	себе́
Instrumental	мной (мно́ю)	тобо́й (тобо́ю)	(н)им		(н)ей ((н)ею)	на́ми	ва́ми	(н)и́ми	собо́й (собо́ю)

- Russian is subject to T-V distinction. The respectful form of the singular you is the same as the plural form. It begins with a capital letter: Вы, Вас, Вам etc. in following situations: personal letters and official papers (addressee is definite), and questionnaires (addressee is indefinite), otherwise it begins with minuscule. Compare the distinction between du and Sie in German or tu and vous in French.
- When a preposition is used directly before a 3rd-person pronoun in oblique cases, н- is prefixed: у него (read: у нево), с неё, etc. Because the prepositional case always occurs after a preposition, the third person prepositional always starts with an н-.
- Like adjectives and numerals, letter г (g) in genitive and accusative form is pronounced as в (v) его/него ево/нево.

=== Demonstrative pronouns ===
этот (this)
	Masc.	Neut.	Fem.	Plur.
Nominative	э́тот	э́то	э́та	э́ти
Accusative	N or G	э́то	э́ту	N or G
Genitive	э́того		э́той	э́тих
Prepositional	э́том		э́той	э́тих
Dative	э́тому		э́той	э́тим
Instrumental	э́тим		э́той	э́тими

тот (that)
	Masc.	Neut.	Fem.	Plur.
Nominative	тот	то	та	те
Accusative	N or G	то	ту	N or G
Genitive	того́		той	тех
Prepositional	том		той	тех
Dative	тому́		той	тем
Instrumental	тем		той	те́ми

=== Possessive adjectives and pronouns ===
Unlike English, Russian uses the same form for a possessive adjective and the corresponding possessive pronoun. In Russian grammar they are called possessive pronouns притяжа́тельные местоиме́ния (compare with possessive adjectives like Peter's = пе́тин above). The following rules apply:

- Possessive pronouns agree with possessed noun in case, gender, and number: Где мои́ очки́? (plural) "Where are my glasses?"; Ви́дел ли ты мою́ дочь? (feminine accusative) Have you seen my daughter?, even if her father is talking. As in English, they also depend on the person and number of the possessor.
- The reflexive pronoun свой is used when the possessor is the subject of the clause, whatever the person, gender, and number of that subject.
- In literary Russian non-reflexive pronouns are not used for the 3rd person; the genitive of the personal pronoun is used instead: его́ (masc./neut. sing. possessor), её (fem. sing. possessor) and их (pl. possessor). Unlike other genitives used with a possessive meaning, in modern Russian these words are usually placed before the object of possession. In colloquial speech, however, sometimes "adjectived" forms are used: его́нный (masc./neut. sing. possessor, rare), и́хний (pl. possessor); they are declined as adjectives.
- Example of the difference between reflexive and non-reflexive pronouns:
  - “Он лю́бит свою́ жену́ = He loves his (own) wife”;
  - “Он лю́бит его́ жену́ = He loves his (someone else's) wife” (for literary Russian);
  - “Он лю́бит его́ = He loves him/it”.
- Unlike Latin where a similar rule applies for the 3rd person only, Russian accepts using reflexives for all persons:
  - “Я люблю́ свою́ жену́ = I love my wife”;
  - “Я люблю́ себя́ = I love myself”.
- The ending -его is pronounced as -ево.

мой (my, mine)
	Masc.	Neut.	Fem.	Plur.
Nominative	мой	моё	моя́	мои́
Accusative	N or G	моё	мою́	N or G
Genitive	моего́		мое́й	мои́х
Prepositional	моём		мое́й	мои́х
Dative	моему́		мое́й	мои́м
Instrumental	мои́м		мое́й	мои́ми

твой (your, yours) for a singular possessor
	Masc.	Neut.	Fem.	Plur.
Nominative	твой	твоё	твоя́	твои́
Accusative	N or G	твоё	твою́	N or G
Genitive	твоего́		твое́й	твои́х
Prepositional	твоём		твое́й	твои́х
Dative	твоему́		твое́й	твои́м
Instrumental	твои́м		твое́й	твои́ми

свой (one's own) for a subject possessor
	Masc.	Neut.	Fem.	Plur.
Nominative	свой	своё	своя́	свои́
Accusative	N or G	своё	свою́	N or G
Genitive	своего́		свое́й	свои́х
Prepositional	своём		свое́й	свои́х
Dative	своему́		свое́й	свои́м
Instrumental	свои́м		свое́й	свои́ми

наш (our, ours)
	Masc.	Neut.	Fem.	Plur.
Nominative	наш	на́ше	на́ша	на́ши
Accusative	N or G	на́ше	на́шу	N or G
Genitive	на́шего		на́шей	на́ших
Prepositional	на́шем		на́шей	на́ших
Dative	на́шему		на́шей	на́шим
Instrumental	на́шим		на́шей	на́шими

ваш (your, yours) for a plural possessor
	Masc.	Neut.	Fem.	Plur.
Nominative	ваш	ва́ше	ва́ша	ва́ши
Accusative	N or G	ва́ше	ва́шу	N or G
Genitive	ва́шего		ва́шей	ва́ших
Prepositional	ва́шем		ва́шей	ва́ших
Dative	ва́шему		ва́шей	ва́шим
Instrumental	ва́шим		ва́шей	ва́шими

=== Interrogative pronouns ===
кто ('who') and что ('what')
	кто	что
Nominative	кто	что (read: што)
Accusative	кого́ (read: каво́)	что (read: што)
Genitive	кого́ (read: каво́)	чего́ (read: чиво́)
Prepositional	ком	чём
Dative	кому́	чему́
Instrumental	кем	чем

чей ('whose')
	masculine	neuter	feminine	plural
Nominative	чей	чьё	чья	чьи
Accusative	N or G	чьё	чью	N or G
Genitive	чьего́		чьей	чьих
Prepositional	чьём		чьей	чьих
Dative	чьему́		чьей	чьим
Instrumental	чьим		чьей	чьи́ми

- The ending -его is pronounced as -ево.

== Numerals ==
Russian has several main classes of numerals (числи́тельные): cardinal, ordinal, collective, and fractional constructions. It also has other types of words, relative to numbers:

- multiplicative adjectives and compound nouns: еди́нственный – single (sole, unique), двойно́й – double, учетверённый – quadrupled, трёхкра́тный – three-times (also as repetition adjective), пятицили́ндровый – five-cylinder; однообра́зие – monotony, тро́йственность – triplicity, семибо́рье – heptathlon;
- multiplicative verbs: утро́ить/утра́ивать – triple, уполови́ни(ва)ть – halve (imp./perf. with/without -ва- suffix);
- multiplicative adverbs: вдвойне́ – doubly, впя́теро – five times (for compound adverbs: впя́теро быстре́е – 5 times faster), вполови́ну – half as;
- collective and repetition adverbs: втроём – three together; четы́режды – four times (with a verb for repeated action or a noun for repeatedly acquired state or title);
- two interrogative and negative adverbs: ско́лько? – how much/many?; ниско́лько – none (at all);
- counting-system, ordinal and partitive adjectives: двои́чный – binary, шестнадцатери́чный – hexadecimal; перви́чный – primary; тро́йственный (трёхча́стный) – three-sided (tripartite);
- two dual numerals: о́ба – both (masculine/neuter), о́бе – both (feminine); but no single word for "neither";
- numeric-pronominal, indefinite quantity words: ско́лько-то, ско́лько-нибудь – some, as much; не́сколько – few; (не)мно́го – (not) much/many; (не)ма́ло – (not a) little; много and мало are also used for compound words: малозна́чимость – small significance, многоу́ровневый – multilevel, малопоня́тно – vaguely (lit.: little clear);
- nouns for a number itself or an object defined by it (symbol, playing cards, banknote, transport route, etc.): едини́ца – number "1", unit; пятисо́тка – number "500" (all feminine); noun for masculine ноль (zero) is но́лик.
- multiple loaned numerals (also used as prefixes and first roots for compound words) from Greek, Latin and (for musical terminology) Italian;

Here are the numerals from 0 to 10:

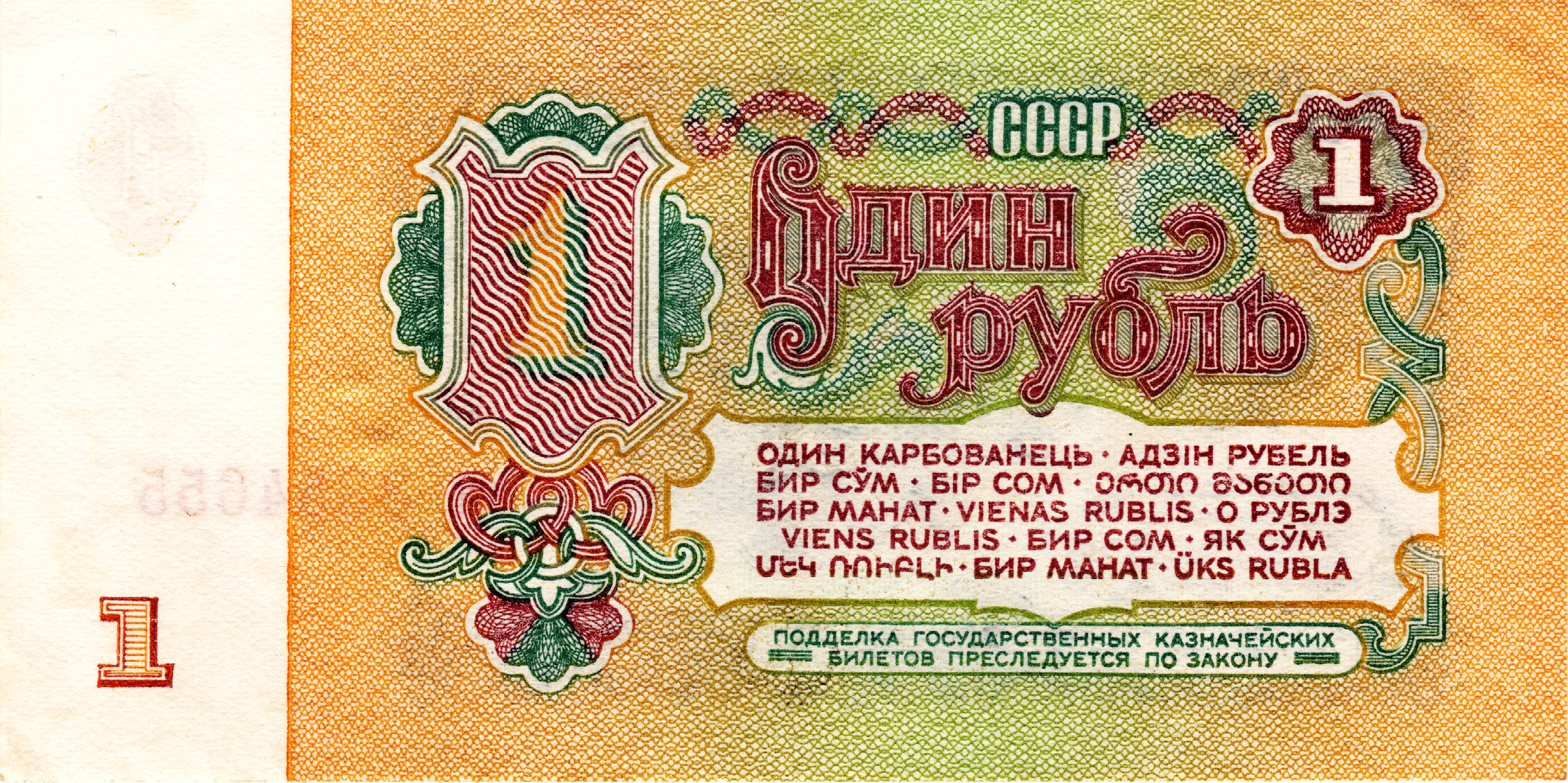
Nouns are used in the nominative case after "one" (один рубль, 'one ruble').

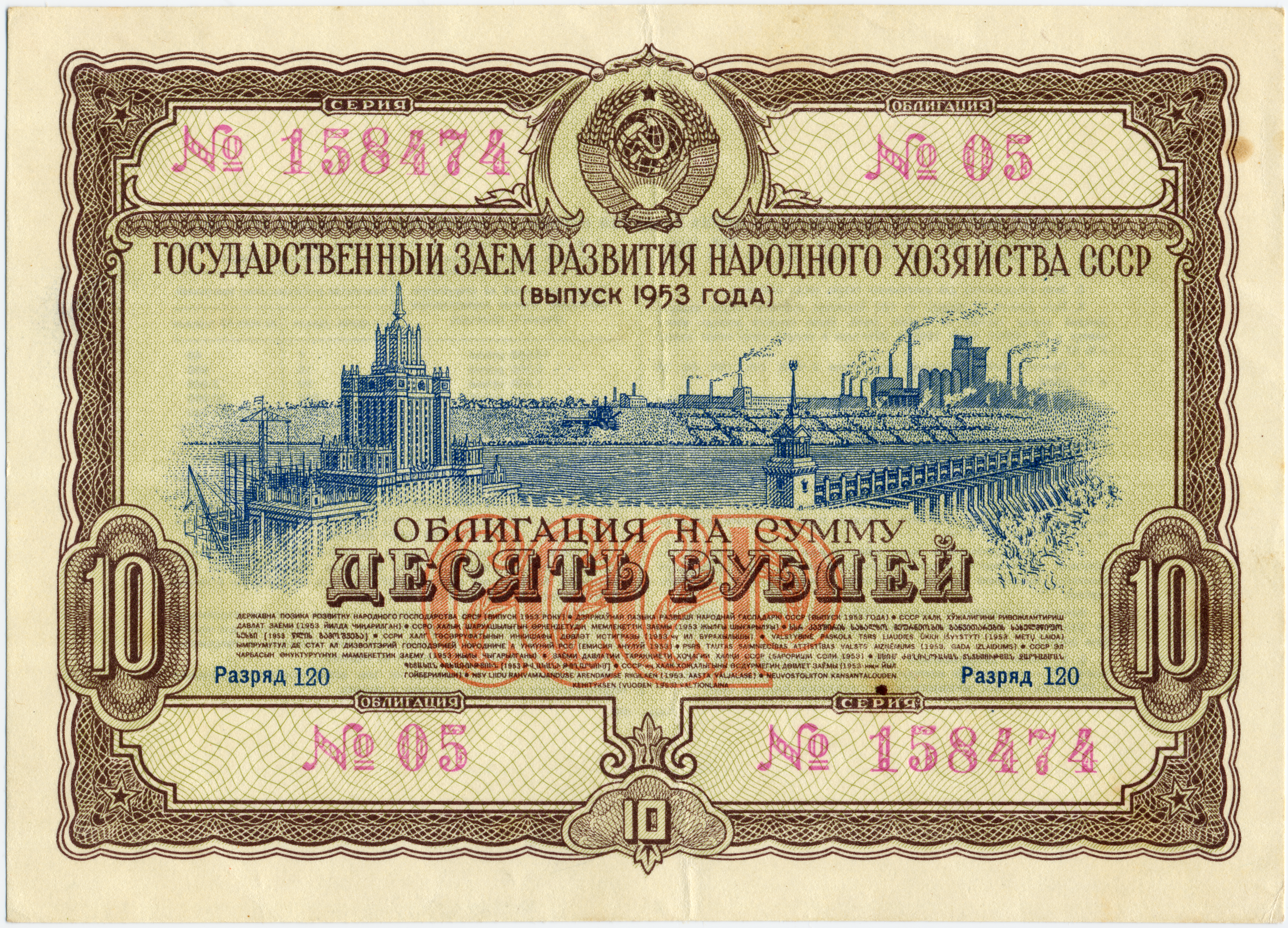
After certain other numbers (following Grammatical number rules in Russian) nouns must be declined to genitive plural (десять рублей, 'ten rubles').

	Cardinal Numbers	Ordinal Numbers (Nominative case, masculine)	Collective Numbers
0	ноль or нуль (m.)	нулево́й	—
1	оди́н (m.), одна́ (f.), одно́ (n.), одни (pl.) (раз is used for counting; един- is used in some compound words)	пе́рвый	—
2	два (m., n.), две (f.)	второ́й	дво́е
3	три	тре́тий	тро́е
4	четы́ре	четвёртый	че́тверо
5	пять	пя́тый	пя́теро
6	шесть	шесто́й	ше́стеро
7	семь	седьмо́й	се́меро
8	во́семь	восьмо́й	(во́сьмеро) (Note: Collective numerals for more than 7 are seldom used.)
9	де́вять	девя́тый	(де́вятеро)
10	де́сять	деся́тый	(де́сятеро)

=== Declension of cardinal numerals ===
Different Russian numerals have very different types of declension. The word оди́н (one) is declined by number, gender (in the singular), and case. The word два (two) is declined by gender and case, all other numbers have only case to decline by. The words for 50, 60, 70, 80, 200, 300, 400, 500, 600, 700, 800, 900 are unique for Russian, as they decline not only with ending in their end, but also with part of word in their middle (since they are originally composed from two words): Nom. пятьдеся́т (50) – Gen. пяти́десяти etc. (compare пять деся́тков – пяти́ деся́тков "five tens").

Compound number phrases are created without any unions: сто пятьдеся́т три ры́бы "153 fish". All numerals are declined concurrently, albeit not always in the spoken language. If numeral is in Nominative or Accusative, ending of the noun is defined by the last numeral word (the least order, see examples below), but this may not be true for an adjective attached to this noun.

Most numbers ending with "1" (in any gender: оди́н, одна́, одно́) require Nominative singular for a noun: два́дцать одна́ маши́на (21 cars), сто пятьдеся́т оди́н челове́к (151 people). Most numbers ending with "2", "3", "4" (два/две, три, четы́ре) require Genitive singular: три соба́ки (3 dogs), со́рок два окна́ (42 windows). All other numbers (including 0 and those ending with it) require Genitive plural: пять я́блок (5 apples), де́сять рубле́й (10 rubles). Genitive plural is also used for numbers ending with 11 to 14 and with inexact numerals: сто оди́ннадцать ме́тров (111 meters); мно́го домо́в (many houses). Nominative plural is used only without numerals: э́ти дома́ (these houses); cf. три до́ма (3 houses; G. sg.). These rules apply only for integer numbers. For rational numbers see below.

In oblique cases, noun and number take both this case, except that the numbers ending with "thousand", "million", "billion" etc. (nouns: ты́сяча (f.), миллио́н (m.), миллиа́рд (m.)) in singular or in plural are regarded as nouns and always require Genitive case in plural: пятью́ ты́сячами (Instr.) маши́н (Gen.); cf. пятью́ маши́нами and пятью́ ты́сячами тремяста́ми маши́нами (all Instr.). Initial (leftmost) numeral "1" can be omitted in combinations (одна́) ты́сяча (ты́сяча и одна́ ночь – 1001 nights), (оди́н) миллио́н, etc.

Nouns со́тня ("approximately 100", f.) and па́ра ("pair", f.) can be declined and can form compound numerals: три со́тни (≈ 300), пять пар носко́в (5 pair of socks). Approximate numbers are colloquially formed by reversing word order, exchanging numeral and noun: мину́ты три (≈3 minutes). Ranges (hyphenated) are also possible: пять-шесть дней (5–6 days), дней пять-шесть (probably 5–6 days). The word ми́нус (minus) declines if standalone, but does not for negative numbers: минус три гра́дуса – minus three degrees (wrong: *минуса три градуса); however: три минуса – three minuses.

один (one)
	Masc.	Neut.	Fem.	Plural
Nominative	оди́н	одно́	одна́	одни́
Accusative	N or G	одно́	одну́	N or G
Genitive	одного́		одно́й	одни́х
Dative	одному́		одно́й	одни́м
Instrumental	одни́м		одно́й	одни́ми
Prepositional	одно́м		одно́й	одни́х

два (two), три (three), четы́ре (four)
	two	three	four
Nominative	два (m./n.), две (f.)	три	четы́ре
Accusative	N or G		
Genitive	двух	трёх	четырёх
Dative	двум	трём	четырём
Instrumental	двумя́	тремя́	четырьмя́
Prepositional	двух	трёх	четырёх

пять (five), шесть (six), семь (seven), во́семь (eight), де́вять (nine), де́сять (ten);
	five	six	seven	eight	nine	ten
Nominative	пять	шесть	семь	во́семь	де́вять	де́сять
Accusative	пять	шесть	семь	во́семь	де́вять	де́сять
Genitive	пяти́	шести́	семи́	восьми́	девяти́	десяти́
Dative	пяти́	шести́	семи́	восьми́	девяти́	десяти́
Instrumental	пятью́	шестью́	семью́	восемью́	девятью́	десятью́
Prepositional	пяти́	шести́	семи́	восьми́	девяти́	десяти́

Special cases: ноль / нуль (zero), о́ба (both, m./n.), о́бе (both, f.)
	zero	both	
	zero	m./n.	f.
Nominative	ноль, нуль	о́ба	о́бе
Accusative	ноль, нуль	N or G	
Genitive	ноля́, нуля́	обо́их	обе́их
Dative	нолю́, нулю́	обо́им	обе́им
Instrumental	нолём, нулём	обо́ими	обе́ими
Prepositional	ноле́, нуле́	обо́их	обе́их

Genitive, Dative, Instrumental and Prepositional cases for "zero" more often use нул- root instead of нол-.

The numbers from 11 to 19 are: оди́ннадцать, двена́дцать, трина́дцать, четы́рнадцать, пятна́дцать, шестна́дцать, семна́дцать, восемна́дцать, девятна́дцать. They decline in the same way as 20 (два́дцать) except that the stress remains on the stem in all forms.

20, 30, 40, 50, 60, 70, 80, 90, 100
	20	30	40	50	60	70	80	90	100
Nominative	два́дцать	три́дцать	со́рок	пятьдеся́т	шестьдеся́т	се́мьдесят	во́семьдесят	девяно́сто	сто
Accusative	два́дцать	три́дцать	со́рок	пятьдеся́т	шестьдеся́т	се́мьдесят	во́семьдесят	девяно́сто	сто
Genitive	двадцати́	тридцати́	сорока́	пяти́десяти	шести́десяти	семи́десяти	восьми́десяти	девяно́ста	ста
Dative	двадцати́	тридцати́	сорока́	пяти́десяти	шести́десяти	семи́десяти	восьми́десяти	девяно́ста	ста
Instrumental	двадцатью́	тридцатью́	сорока́	пятью́десятью	шестью́десятью	семью́десятью	восемью́десятью or восьмью́десятью	девяно́ста	ста
Prepositional	двадцати́	тридцати́	сорока́	пяти́десяти	шести́десяти	семи́десяти	восьми́десяти	девяно́ста	ста

200, 300, 400, 500, 600, 700, 800, 900
	200	300	400	500	600	700	800	900
Nominative	две́сти	три́ста	четы́реста	пятьсо́т	шестьсо́т	семьсо́т	восемьсо́т	девятьсо́т
Accusative	две́сти	три́ста	четы́реста	пятьсо́т	шестьсо́т	семьсо́т	восемьсо́т	девятьсо́т
Genitive	двухсо́т	трёхсо́т	четырёхсо́т	пятисо́т	шестисо́т	семисо́т	восьмисо́т	девятисо́т
Dative	двумста́м	трёмста́м	четырёмста́м	пятиста́м	шестиста́м	семиста́м	восьмиста́м	девятиста́м
Instrumental	двумяста́ми	трeмяста́ми	четырьмяста́ми	пятьюста́ми	шестьюста́ми	семьюста́ми	восьмьюста́ми	девятьюста́ми
Prepositional	двухста́х	трёхста́х	четырёхста́х	пятиста́х	шестиста́х	семиста́х	восьмиста́х	девятиста́х

ты́сяча (1,000), feminine
	Singular	Plural
Nominative	ты́сяча	ты́сячи
Accusative	ты́сячу	ты́сячи
Genitive	ты́сячи	ты́сяч
Dative	ты́сяче	ты́сячам
Instrumental	ты́сячью, ты́сячей	ты́сячами
Prepositional	ты́сяче	ты́сячах

миллио́н (1,000,000), masculine
	Singular	Plural
Nominative	миллио́н	миллио́ны
Accusative	миллио́н	миллио́ны
Genitive	миллио́на	миллио́нов
Dative	миллио́ну	миллио́нам
Instrumental	миллио́ном	миллио́нами
Prepositional	миллио́не	миллио́нах

For numbers above 1,000 Russian uses a modified short scale with the following loanwords: миллио́н (10^{6}, million; as for both long and short scales), миллиа́рд (10^{9}, milliard; as for long scale – an exception), триллио́н (10^{12}, trillion), квадриллио́н (10^{15}, quadrillion), квинтиллио́н (10^{18}, quintillion), etc. (continued as short scale). They decline in the same way as миллио́н. Russian uses words биллио́н (billion) and numerals with -ard endings only in historical texts or literal translations. Also, биллиа́рд (billiard) is a noun meaning a cue sport.

Examples
	51 meters	6 944 meters	32 197 meters
Nominative	пятьдеся́т^{n=a} оди́н^{n=a} метр^{n=a}	шесть^{n=a} ты́сяч^{G} девятьсо́т^{n=a} со́рок^{n=a} четы́ре^{n=a} ме́тра^{g}	три́дцать^{n=a} две^{n=a} ты́сячи^{g} сто^{n=a} девяно́сто^{n=a} семь^{n=a} ме́тров^{G}
Accusative	пятьдеся́т^{n=a} оди́н^{n=a} метр^{n=a}	шесть^{n=a} ты́сяч^{G} девятьсо́т^{n=a} со́рок^{n=a} четы́ре^{n=a} ме́тра^{g}	три́дцать^{n=a} две^{n=a} ты́сячи^{g} сто^{n=a} девяно́сто^{n=a} семь^{n=a} ме́тров^{G}
Genitive	пяти́десяти́^{g} одного́^{g} ме́тра^{g}	шести́^{g} тысяч^{G} девятисо́т^{g} сорока́^{g} четырёх^{g} ме́тров^{G}	тридцати́^{g} двух^{g} ты́сяч^{G} ста^{g} девяно́ста^{g} семи́^{g} ме́тров^{G}
Dative	пяти́десяти́^{d} одному́^{d} ме́тру^{d}	шести́^{d} ты́сячам^{D} девятиста́м^{d} сорока́^{d} четырём^{d} ме́трам^{D}	тридцати́^{d} двум^{d} ты́сячам^{D} ста^{d} девяно́ста^{d} семи́^{d} ме́трам^{D}
Instrumental	пятью́деся́тью́^{i} одни́м^{i} ме́тром^{i}	шестью́^{i} ты́сячами^{I} девятьюста́ми^{i} сорока́^{i} четырьмя́^{i} ме́трами^{I}	тридцатью́^{i} двумя́^{i} ты́сячами^{I} ста^{i} девяно́ста^{i} семью́^{i} ме́трами^{I}
Prepositional	пяти́десяти́^{p} одно́м^{p} ме́тре^{p}	шести́^{p} ты́сячах^{P} девятиста́х^{p} сорока́^{p} четырёх^{p} ме́трах^{P}	тридцати́^{p} двух^{p} ты́сячах^{P} ста^{p} девяно́ста^{p} семи́^{p} ме́трах^{P}

Note for superscript case notations: small letters denote singular forms, capitals denote plural. Метр is masculine (important for "51"); both метр and тысяча are inanimate (important for Accusative). Blue digits are indicatives of case endings, marked by blue letters.

=== Collective numerals ===
Collective numerals (Russian: собира́тельные числи́тельные) are used in Russian (and many other Slavic languages) instead of usual cardinal ones in specific lexical and semantic situations. Russian collective numerals are different from the cardinal numerals in that the former emphasize ‘the totality’ or ‘the aggregate as a whole’, while the latter – ‘the individuated quantity’. Only numerals from 2 (двое) to 7 (семеро) are actively used nowadays, while 8 to 10 are seldom used and 11–13 are not normative; word о́ба (both) is also considered to be collective numeral. In nominative and accusative, they always force the noun into genitive plural form (while their own accusative form is dependent on the animacy of the noun): трое друзей на охоту пошли, вижу двоих мужчин, вижу двое саней. (Three friends went hunting [together], I see two men [together], I see two sleighs [together].) These numerals are seldom used in oblique cases, especially instrumental. A brief table of usage situations follows:

Usage of Russian collective numerals
Usage	Number	Case	Example	Notes
Mandatory	2–4	Pluralia tantum nouns in nominative case	двое ножниц, трое похорон	With paired objects, construction with classifier пара are preferred: две пары ножниц
Normative	5–7	Pluralia tantum nouns in nominative case	пятеро прений	With paired objects, construction with classifier пара are preferred: две пары ножниц
Likely mandatory	3, 4	Masculine (and common-gender as masculine and mixed-gender) nouns in -а/-я	трое мужчин, о четверых судьях	
Preferred	2–7	Masculine (and rarely neuter) personal nouns, including common-gender but excluding presumed female groups	трое друзей, пятеро мальчиков, шестеро мужчин	Collective numerals are used to emphasize the cohesiveness of the group, while cardinal (пять мальчиков etc.) shows more individuality. In oblique cases, there is no preference to collective numerals.
Colloquial	2–7	Feminine nouns denoting people	трое подруг	Collective numerals are used to emphasize the cohesiveness of the group, while cardinal (пять мальчиков etc.) shows more individuality. In oblique cases, there is no preference to collective numerals.
Unlikely used	2–7	Terms of high rank	два министра (instead of *двое министров), два короля (instead of *двое королей)	Collective numerals are used to emphasize the cohesiveness of the group, while cardinal (пять мальчиков etc.) shows more individuality. In oblique cases, there is no preference to collective numerals.
Prohibited	2–7	First names	три Коли, not *трое Коль	Collective numerals are used to emphasize the cohesiveness of the group, while cardinal (пять мальчиков etc.) shows more individuality. In oblique cases, there is no preference to collective numerals.
Preferred	2–7	With masculine nominalized adjectives	двое рабочих, пятеро учёных	Mostly in nominative
Preferred	2–7	With дети (children), especially about number in a family	У неё двое детей	8–10 are seldom used; in oblique cases is optional
Preferred	2–7	With ребята (children), внук	пятеро ребят, трое внуков	
Colloquial	2–7	With animal's cubs in -ата/ята	пятеро щенят	
Highly likely	2–7 (2–10)	As noun denoting people group or with personal pronoun	Нас было четверо. Шестеро бились против десятерых	

Dobrushina and Panteleeva (2008), having analyzed usage of два/двое in a Russian corpus, summarize cases of usage of collective numerals in the following common rules:

1. Collective numerals denote number of persons likely to have collective behaviour, i.e., existence in groups, not one by one: боевики́ 'militants', жи́тели 'inhabitants', пассажи́ры 'passengers', солда́ты 'soldiers'.
2. Collective numbers are used while denoting several persons to emphasize unity, cohesion of this group.
3. Contexts of nominal groups with collective numerals have properties showing their individualization and dedication: referentness, empathy, definiteness; they are unlikely to be out of focus.

=== Ordinal numerals ===
Ordinal numbers have grammatically no differences with adjectives. While forming them, upper three orders of numerals are agglutinated to nearest dividing power of 1000, which results in constructing some of the longest natural Russian words, e.g. стапятидесятитрёхты́сячный (153,000-th), while the next is сто пятьдеся́т три ты́сячи пе́рвый (153,001-st). In the latter example, only the last word is declined with noun.

=== Fractions ===
Fractions are formed as: (how much parts), expressed by cardinal number in case of the phrase, plus (of how numerous parts), expressed by ordinal number; the construction is formed as like it were related to word часть "part" (grammatically feminine), which is usually omitted. Noun to such construction always comes in Genitive single, also as like it belonged to word часть: девяно́сто две пятидеся́тых то́нны " 92/50 tons". If an integer precedes a fraction, it is bound to it usually with the conjunction и, while the noun remains in Genitive: два и три восьмы́х оборо́та "2 3/8 turns" (оборо́т is masculine, so the numeral is два, not *две).

Fractions 1/2, 1/3 and 1/4 have proper names (nouns): полови́на, треть and че́тверть, which are used instead of ordinal numbers. They are also often added with preposition с, while form of noun appears to be related to the integer part rather than to the fraction: де́сять с че́твертью [Instr.] оборо́тов [Gen.] "10 1/4 turns". Prefixes пол- (with Genitive) and полу- (with Nominative) are used for "half" of something: пол-лимо́на (half of a lemon), полчаса́ (half an hour; but: полови́на ча́са); полуме́сяц (half moon, crescent). Words with пол- are not declined, and there is a set of rules for writing with or without dash.

For "1 1/2" there is a special word полтора́ (feminine полторы́; in oblique cases полу́тора; requires Genitive): полтора́ я́блока – 3/2 apples. It can be used with larger numbers (полторы́ ты́сячи – 1 500, полтора миллио́на – 1 500 000) and, for approximate values, with smaller numbers (полтора деся́тка – ≈ 15, полторы со́тни – ≈ 150). There was also now-outdated form полтора́ста for exactly 150. As with other single-word numerals, it's possible to form nouns and multiplicative adjectives, associated with "1.5": полу́торка (old truck with 1.5 tonnes of payload capacity), полтора́шка (1.5 liter plastic bottle for beverage); полу́торный (something of 150% amount). Also (colloquially): полтора́ челове́ка "almost nobody" (lit. one and a half men).

To read decimal fractions, (Note: In Russian, the comma is used as the decimal separator.) convert them to simple ones: 2,71828 = 2 + 71828/100000 - два и се́мьдесят одна́ ты́сяча восемьсо́т два́дцать во́семь стоты́сячных. After integer in such cases is often used word це́лая (nominalized adjective "full, integer", which also refers to omitted word часть and thus is feminine): 3,14 – три це́лых (и) четы́рнадцать со́тых (union is often omitted); word це́лая can appear also in naming non-decimal simple fractions: 2 3/8 – две це́лых три восьмы́х. Zero before comma is often read: 0,01 = 0 + 1/100 – ноль це́лых одна́ со́тая (shortly: одна́ со́тая). Informally, decimal fractional part can be read more conveniently as sequence of simple digits and numbers: два и семь-восемна́дцать-два́дцать во́семь. Same method is used to read long numerals unrelated to a noun (phone numbers, address indexes, etc.), grouping two or three digits: 123406 – сто два́дцать три четы́реста шесть, двенадцать три́дцать четы́ре ноль шесть (forced ноль added to avoid missing digit).

=== Count form ===
Russian also has so-called "count form" (счётная фо́рма) for use by nouns in numerical phrases instead of genitive plural (for some words mandatory, for others optional), mainly with units of measure (especially derived from names): во́семь бит (8 bits; not *би́тов), шестна́дцать байт (16 bytes), две́сти два́дцать вольт (220 volts), пять килогра́мм(ов) (5 kilograms; optional). But: коли́чество ба́йтов (amount of bytes), изба́виться от ли́шних килогра́ммов (get rid of excess kilograms).

Count form also exists for paucal numbers (1.5, 2, 3 and 4); usually it coincides with genitive singular, but has notable exceptions with stressed endings: два часа́ (2 hours), but середи́на ча́са (middle of an hour); два́дцать два шара́ (22 balls), but объём ша́ра (volume of the ball); три ряда́ (3 rows/lines), but вы́йти из ря́да (step out of the line); четы́ре шага́ (4 steps), but полша́га (half a step). Полчаса́ (half an hour) is additional exception; other nouns with пол- prefix does not have stressed -а ending.

A few nouns have unrelated suppletive genitive plural forms: 4 го́да, but 5 лет (years); 3 челове́ка, but 30 люде́й/челове́к (people; optional). Count forms for adjectives and nouns with adjectival declension after numerals require genitive plural and nominative plural: два лу́чших (G. pl.) игрока́ (G. sg.) "2 best players"; три зелёные (N. pl.) прямы́е (N. pl.) lit. "3 green straight lines", but три зелёных (G. pl.) прямы́х (G. pl.) штриха́ (G. sg.) lit. "3 green straight strokes".
