= Dual (grammatical number) =

Grammatical number in addition to singular and plural

Dual (abbreviated du) is a grammatical number that some languages use in addition to singular and plural. When a noun or pronoun appears in dual form, it is interpreted as referring to precisely two of the entities (objects or persons) identified by the noun or pronoun acting as a single unit or in unison. Verbs can also have dual agreement forms in these languages.

The dual number existed in Proto-Indo-European and persisted in many of its descendants, such as Ancient Greek and Sanskrit, which have dual forms across nouns, verbs, and adjectives; Gothic, which used dual forms in pronouns and verbs; and Old English (Anglo-Saxon), which used dual forms in its pronouns. It can still be found in a few modern Indo-European languages such as Irish, Scottish Gaelic, Lithuanian, Slovene, and Sorbian languages.

The majority of modern Indo-European languages, including modern English, have lost the dual number through their development. Its function has mostly been replaced by the simple plural. They may however show residual traces of the dual, for example in the English distinctions: both vs. all, either vs. any, neither vs. none, and so on. A commonly used sentence to exemplify dual in English is "Both go to the same school." where both refers to two specific people who had already been determined in the conversation.

Many Semitic languages have dual number. For instance, in Hebrew יים- (-ayim) or a variation of it is added to the end of some nouns, e.g. some parts of the body (eye, ear, nostril, lip, hand, leg) and some time periods (minute, hour, day, week, month, year) to indicate that it is dual (regardless of how the plural is formed). A similar situation exists in classical Arabic, where ان -ān is added to the end of any noun to indicate that it is dual (regardless of how the plural is formed).

It is also present in Khoisan languages that have an extensive inflectional morphology, particularly Khoe languages, as well as Kunama, a Nilo-Saharan language.

== Comparative characteristics ==
Many languages make a distinction between singular and plural: English, for example, distinguishes between man and men, or house and houses. In some languages, in addition to such singular and plural forms, there is also a dual form, which is used when exactly two people or things are meant. In many languages with dual forms, the use of the dual is mandatory as in some Arabic dialects using dual in nouns as in Hejazi Arabic, and the plural is used only for groups greater than two. However, the use of the dual is optional in some languages such as other modern Arabic dialects including Egyptian Arabic.

In other languages such as Hebrew, the dual exists only for words naming time spans (day, week, etc.), a few measure words, and for words that naturally come in pairs and are not used in the plural except in rhetoric: eyes, ears, and so forth.

In Slovene, the use of the dual is mandatory except for nouns that are natural pairs, such as trousers, eyes, ears, lips, hands, arms, legs, feet, kidneys, breasts, lungs, etc., for which the plural form has to be used unless one wants to stress that something is true for both one and the other part. For example, one says oči me bolijo ('my eyes hurt', using plural forms), but if they want to stress that both their eyes hurt, they say obe očesi me bolita (using dual forms). When using the pronoun obe/oba ('both'), the dual form that follows is mandatory. But the use of "obe (both)" is not mandatory since "očesi (two eyes)" as it is, implies that one means both eyes.

Although relatively few languages have the dual number, using different words for groups of two and groups greater than two is not uncommon. English has words distinguishing dual vs. plural number, including: both/all, either/any, neither/none, between/among, former/first, and latter/last. Japanese, which has no grammatical number, also has words dochira (どちら, 'which of the two') and dore (どれ, 'which of the three or more'), etc.

== Use in modern languages ==
Among living languages, Modern Standard Arabic has a mandatory dual number, marked on nouns, verbs, adjectives, and pronouns. (First-person dual forms, however, do not exist; compare this to the lack of third-person dual forms in the old Germanic languages and the lack of first-person dual verb forms in Ancient Greek.) Many of the spoken Arabic dialects have a dual marking for nouns (only), and its use can be mandatory in some dialects, and not mandatory in others. Likewise, Akkadian had a dual number, though its use was confined to standard phrases like "two hands", "two eyes", and "two arms". The dual in Hebrew has also atrophied, generally being used for only time, number, and natural pairs (like body parts) even in its most ancient form.

Inuktitut and the related Central Alaskan Yup'ik language use dual forms; however, the related Greenlandic language does not (though it used to have them).

Khoekhoegowab and other Khoe languages mark dual number in their person-gender-number enclitics, though the neuter gender does not have a dual form.

Austronesian languages, particularly Polynesian languages such as Hawaiian, Niuean, and Tongan, possess a dual number for pronouns but not for nouns, as nouns are generally marked for plural syntactically and not morphologically. Other Austronesian languages, particularly those spoken in the Philippines, have a dual first-person pronoun; these languages include Ilokano (data), Tausug (kita), and Kapampangan (ìkatá). These forms mean "we", but specifically "you and I". This form once existed in Tagalog (katá or sometimes kitá) but has disappeared from standard usage (save for certain dialects such as in Batangas) since the middle of the 20th century, with kitá as the only surviving form (e.g. Mahál kitá, loosely "I love you").

The dual was a standard feature of the Proto-Uralic language, and lives on in the Samoyedic branch and in most Sami languages, while other members of the family like Finnish, Estonian, and Hungarian have lost it. Sami languages also feature dual pronouns, expressing the concept of "we two here" as contrasted to "we". Nenets, two closely related Samoyedic languages, features a complete set of dual possessive suffixes for two systems, the number of possessors and the number of possessed objects (for example, "two houses of us two" expressed in one word).

The dual form is also used in several modern Indo-European languages, such as Irish, Scottish Gaelic, Slovene, and Sorbian (see below for details). The dual was a common feature of all early Slavic languages around the year 1000.

== Arabic ==
In Modern Standard Arabic, as well as in Classical Arabic, the use of dual is compulsory when describing two units. For this purpose, ان -ān is added to the end of any noun or adjective regardless of gender or of how the plural is formed. In the case of feminine nouns ending with ة ta marbuta, this letter becomes a ت ta. When the dual noun or adjective is rendered in the genitive or accusative cases, the ان -ān becomes ين -ain.

Besides the noun and adjective dual, there are also dual verb forms of compulsory use for second and third person, together with their pronouns, but none for the first person.

The use of dual in spoken Arabic varies widely and is mostly rendered as ين -ain even when in nominative context. Whereas its use is quite common in Levantine Arabic, for instance كيلوين kilowain meaning "two kilograms", dual forms are generally not used in Maghrebi Arabic, where two units are commonly expressed with the word زوج zuʒ, زوز zuz, or جوج ʒuʒ (in the Algerian, Tunisian, and Moroccan dialects respectively) as in زوج كيلو zuʒ kilu meaning "a pair of kilograms", with the noun appearing in singular.

== Hebrew ==
=== Biblical and Mishnaic Hebrew ===
In Biblical, Mishnaic, and Medieval Hebrew, like Arabic and other Semitic languages, all nouns can have singular, plural or dual forms, and there is still a debate whether there are vestiges of dual verbal forms and pronouns. However, in practice, most nouns use only singular and plural forms. Usually ־ים -īm is added to masculine words to make them plural for example ספר / ספרים sēfer / səfārīm "book / books", whilst with feminine nouns the ־ה -ā is replaced with ־ות -ōṯ. For example, פרה / פרות pārā / pārōṯ "cow / cows". The masculine dual form is shown in pointed text with a pathach; in a purely consonantal text, masculine dual is not indicated at all by the consonants. The dual for (two) days is יוֹמַ֫יִם with pathach under the mem. An example of the dual form is יום / יומיים / ימים yōm / yomạyim / yāmīm "day / two days / [two or more] days". Some words occur so often in pairs that the form with the dual suffix -ạyim is used in practice for the general plural, such as עין / עינים ʿạyin / ʿēnạyim "eye / eyes", used even in a sentence like "The spider has eight eyes." Thus words like ʿēnạyim only appear to be dual, but are in fact what is called "pseudo-dual", which is a way of making a plural. Sometimes, words can change meaning depending on whether the dual or plural form is used, for example; ʿayin can mean eye or water spring in the singular, but in the plural eyes will take the dual form of ʿenayim whilst springs are ʿeynot. Adjectives, verbs, and pronouns have only singular and plural, with the plural forms of these being used with dual nouns.

=== Modern Hebrew ===
In Modern Hebrew as used in Israel, there is also a dual number, but its use is very restricted. The dual form is usually used in expressions of time and number. These nouns have plurals as well, which are used for numbers higher than two, for example:

Singular	Double	Triple
פעם páʿam ("time", frequency)	פעמיים paʿamáyim ("twice")	שלוש פעמים shalosh pəʿamim ("thrice")
יום yom ("day")	יומיים yomáyim ("two days")	שלושה ימים shəlosha yamim ("three days")
שנה shaná ("year")	שנתיים shnatáyim ("two years")	שלוש שנים shalosh shanim ("three years")
שבוע shavúaʿ ("week")	שבועיים shəvuʿáyim ("two weeks")	שלושה שבועות shəlosha shavuʿot ("three weeks")
מאה meʾa ("one hundred")	מאתיים matáyim ("two hundred")	שלוש מאות shəlosh meʾot ("three hundred")

The pseudo-dual is used to form the plural of some body parts, garments, etc., for instance:

רגל régel ("leg") → רגליים ragláyim ("legs")
אוזן ózen ("ear") → אוזניים oznáyim ("ears")
שן shen ("tooth") → שניים shináyim ("teeth")
מעי məʿi ("intestine") → מעיים məʿáyim ("intestines")
נעל náʿal ("shoe") → נעליים naʿaláyim ("shoes")
גרב gérev ("sock") → גרביים garbáyim ("socks")

In this case, even if there are more than two, the dual is still used, for instance יש לכלב ארבע רגליים yesh lə-ḵélev arbaʿ ragláyim ("a dog has four legs").

Another case of the pseudo-dual is duale tantum (a kind of plurale tantum) nouns:

נקודתיים nəkudatáyim ("colon", lit. "two dots")
אופניים ofanáyim ("bicycle", lit. "two wheels")
משקפיים mishkafáyim ("eyeglasses", lit. "two lenses")
שמיים shamáyim ("sky")
מספריים misparáyim ("scissors")

== Khoe languages ==
In Nama, nouns have three genders and three grammatical numbers.

	Singular	Dual	Plural	
Feminine	piris	pirira	piridi	goat
Masculine	arib	arikha	arigu	dog
Neuter	khoe-i	khoera	khoen	people

The non-Khoe Khoesan languages (Tuu and Kxʼa), do not have dual number marking of nouns.

== In Indo-European languages ==
The category of dual can be reconstructed for Proto-Indo-European, the ancestor of all Indo-European languages, and it has been retained as a fully functioning category in the earliest attested daughter languages. The best evidence for the dual among ancient Indo-European languages can be found in Old Indo-Iranian (Vedic Sanskrit and Avestan), Homeric Greek and Old Church Slavonic, where its use was obligatory for all inflected categories including verbs, nouns, adjectives, pronouns and some numerals. Various traces of dual can also be found in Gothic, Old Irish, and Latin (more below).

Due to the scarcity of evidence, the reconstruction of dual endings for Proto-Indo-European is difficult, but at least formally according to the comparative method it can be ascertained that no more than three dual endings are reconstructible for nominal inflection. Mallory & Adams (2006) reconstruct the dual endings as:

- Nominative/accusative/vocative: *-h₁(e)
- Genitive/ablative: *-h₁(e) / *-oHs
- Dative: *-me / *-OH
- Locative: *-h₁ow
- Instrumental: *-bʰih₁

The Proto-Indo-European category of dual did not only denote two of something: it could also be used as an associative marker, the so-called elliptical dual. For example, the Vedic deity Mitrá, when appearing in dual form Mitrā́, refers to both Mitra and his companion Varuṇa. Homeric dual Αἴαντε refers to Ajax the Greater and his fighting companion Teucer, and Latin plural Castorēs is used to denote both the semi-god Castor and his twin brother Pollux.

Beside nominal (nouns, adjectives and pronouns), the dual was also present in verbal inflection where the syncretism was much lower.

Of living Indo-European languages, the dual can be found in dialects of Scottish Gaelic, but fully functioning as a paradigmatic category only in Slovene, and Sorbian. Remnants of the dual can be found in many of the remaining daughter languages, where certain forms of the noun are used with the number two (see below for examples).

=== Indo-Aryan ===
==== Sanskrit ====
The dual is widely used in Sanskrit. Its use is mandatory when the number of objects is two, and the plural is not permitted in this case, with one exception (see below). It is always indicated by the declensional suffix (and some morphophonemic modifications to the root resulting from addition of the suffix).

For nouns, the dual forms are the same in the following sets of cases, with examples for the masculine noun bāla (boy):

- nominative/accusative: bālau
- instrumental/dative/ablative: bālābhyām
- genitive/locative: bālayoḥ

In Sanskrit, adjectives are treated the same as nouns as far as case declensions are concerned. As for pronouns, the same rules apply, except for a few special forms used in some cases.

Verbs have distinct dual forms in the three persons in both the ātmanepada and parasmaipada forms of verbs. For instance, the root pac meaning "to cook", takes the following forms in the dual number of the present tense, called laṭ lakāra:

Person	Parasmaipada	Ātmanepada
3rd (prathama)	pacataḥ	pacete
2nd (madhyama)	pacathaḥ	pacethe
1st (uttama)	pacāvaḥ	pacāvahe

(In Sanskrit, the order of the persons is reversed.)

The one exception to the rigidness about dual number is in the case of the pronoun asmad (I/we): Sanskrit grammar permits one to use the plural number for asmad even if the actual number of objects denoted is one or two (this is similar to the "royal we"). For example, while ahaṃ bravīmi, āvāṃ brūvaḥ and vayaṃ brūmaḥ are respectively the singular, dual and plural forms of "I say" and "we say", vayaṃ brūmaḥ can be used in the singular and dual sense as well.

==== Punjabi ====
Similarly to developments in other branches of Indo-European, Prakrit and its descendants lost the dual entirely. One partial exception would eventually arise independently in Punjabi, where the locative plural is also an instrumental dual. Unlike the locative plural, the instrumental dual is mainly reserved for paired body parts such as eyes, ears, hands and feet:

Direct singular	Instrumental dual
ਅੱਖ akkh (eye)	ਅੱਖੀਂ akkhī̃ (using both eyes)
ਕੰਨ kann (ear)	ਕੰਨੀਂ kannī̃ (using both ears)
ਹੱਥ hatth (hand)	ਹੱਥੀਂ hatthī̃ (using both hands)
ਪੈਰ pair (foot)	ਪੈਰੀਂ pairī̃ (using both feet)

The Punjabi instrumental dual is unrelated to the Sanskrit dual, instead being cognate with the Sanskrit locative and instrumental plural.

=== Greek ===
The dual can be found in Ancient Greek Homeric texts such as the Iliad and the Odyssey, although its use is only sporadic, owing as much to artistic prerogatives as dictional and metrical requirements within the hexametric meter. There were only two distinct forms of the dual in Ancient Greek: the nominative-accusative-vocative and the genitive-dative.

By the fifth century BC, the dual had been lost in some dialects, and had become rare in those that retained it. In the Attic dialect of Athens (which formed the basis of Classical Greek), its use depended on the author, and it was generally limited to certain fossilized expressions. The dual fell out of use entirely by the fourth century BC, with the exception of the occasional intentional archaism.

In Koine Greek and Modern Greek, the only remnant of the dual is the numeral for "two", δύο, dýo, which has lost its genitive and dative cases (both δυοῖν, dyoīn) and retains its nominative/accusative form. Thus it appears to be undeclined in all cases. Nevertheless, Aristophanes of Byzantium, the foremost authority of his time (early 2nd century BC) on grammar and style, and a staunch defender of "proper" High Attic tradition, admonishes those who write [δυσί (dysí) (dative, plural number) rather than the "correct" δυοῖν (dyoīn) (dative, dual number).

=== Latin ===
The dual was lost in Latin and its sister Italic languages. However, certain fossilized forms remained; for example, viginti ('twenty'), but triginta ('thirty'); also ambo / ambae ('both') and duo / duae ('two').

=== Celtic languages ===
Reconstructed Proto-Celtic nominal and adjectival declensions contain distinct dual forms; pronouns and verbs do not. In Old Irish, nouns and the definite article still have dual forms, but only when accompanied by the numeral *da "two". Traces of the dual remain in Middle Welsh, in nouns denoting pairs of body parts that incorporate the numeral two: e.g. deulin (from glin "knee"), dwyglust (from clust "ear").

In the modern languages, there are still significant remnants of dual number in Irish and Scottish Gaelic in nominal phrases containing the numeral dhá or dà (including the higher numerals 12, 22, etc.). As the following table shows, dhá and dà combines with a singular noun, which is lenited. Masculine nouns take no special inflection, but feminine nouns have a slenderized dual form, which is in fact identical to the dative singular.

Singular	Dual	Plural
lámh ("a hand" in Irish)	dhá láimh ("two hands")	trí lámh ("three hands")
clach ("a stone" in Scottish Gaelic)	dà chloich ("two stones")	trì clachan ("three stones")

Languages of the Brythonic branch do not have dual number. As mentioned above for Middle Welsh, some nouns can be said to have dual forms, prefixed with a form of the numeral "two" (Breton daou- / div-, Welsh dau- / deu- / dwy-, Cornish dew- / diw-). This process is not fully productive, however, and the prefixed forms are semantically restricted. For example, Breton daouarn (< dorn "hand") can only refer to one person's pair of hands, not any two hands from two different people. Welsh deufis must refer to a period of two consecutive months, whereas dau fis can be any two months (compare "fortnight" in English as opposed to "two weeks" or "14 days"; the first must, but the second and third need not, be a single consecutive period). The modern Welsh term dwylo (= hands) is formed by adding the feminine (and conjoining) form of 'two' (dwy) with the word for 'hand' — llaw becoming lo as it is no longer in a stressed syllable.

=== Old, Middle, and Modern English ===
In Proto-Germanic, the dual had been entirely lost in nouns, and since verbs agreed with nouns in number, the third person dual form of verbs was also lost. The dual therefore remained only in the first and second person pronouns and their accompanying verb forms. Old English further lost all remaining dual verbs, keeping only first and second person dual pronouns. The Old English first person dual pronoun was wit in the nominative and unc in the accusative, and the second person equivalents were git and inc respectively. The West Saxon dialect also had the genitive forms of uncer for first person and incer for second person. The dual lasted beyond Old English into the Early Middle English period in the Southern and Midland dialects. Middle English saw git evolve into ȝit, and inc can be seen in various different forms including ȝinc, ȝunc, unk, hunk, and hunke. The dual mostly died out in the early 1200s, surviving to around 1300 only in the East Midland dialect.

In a small number of modern English dialects, dual pronouns have independently returned. These include:

- Australian Aboriginal English (Central) - menyou (first person inclusive), mentwofella (first person exclusive), yountwofella (second person), twofella (third person)
- Australian Aboriginal English (Northwest Queensland) - midubela or minabela (first person), yudubela or yunabela (second person), dattufela or distufela (third person)
- Torres Strait English - mitu (first person), yutu (second person), themtu (third person)
- Palmerston Island English - yumi (first person inclusive), himshe (third person)

=== Other Germanic languages ===
Gothic retained the dual more or less unchanged from Proto-Germanic. It had markings for the first and second person for both the verbs and pronouns, for example wit "we two" as compared to weis "we, more than two". Old Norse and other old Germanic languages, like Old English, had dual marking only in the personal pronouns and not in the verbs.

The dual has disappeared as a productive form in all the living languages, with loss of the dual occurring in North Frisian dialects only quite recently. In Austro-Bavarian, the old dual pronouns have replaced the standard plural pronouns: nominative es, accusative enk (from Proto-Germanic *jut and *inkw, *inkwiz). A similar development in the pronoun system can be seen in Icelandic and Faroese. Another remnant of the dual can be found in the use of the pronoun begge ("both") in the Scandinavian languages of Norwegian and Danish, bägge in Swedish and báðir / báðar / bæði in Faroese and Icelandic. In these languages, in order to state "all + number", the constructions are begge to / báðir tveir / báðar tvær / bæði tvö ("all two") but alle tre / allir þrír / allar þrjár / öll þrjú ("all three"). In German, the expression beide ("both") is equivalent to, though more commonly used than, alle zwei ("all two").

Norwegian Nynorsk also retains the conjunction korgje ("one of two") and its inverse korkje ("neither of two").

A remnant of a lost dual also survives in the Icelandic and Faroese ordinals first and second, which can be translated two ways: First there is fyrri / fyrri / fyrra and seinni / seinni / seinna, which mean the first and second of two respectively, while fyrsti / fyrsta / fyrsta and annar / önnur / annað mean first and second of more than two. In Icelandic the pronouns annar / önnur / annað ("one") and hinn / hin / hitt ("other") are also used to denote each unit of a set of two in contrast to the pronouns einn / ein / eitt ("one") and annar / önnur / annað ("second"). Therefore in Icelandic "with one hand" translates as með annarri hendi not með einni hendi, and as in English "with the other hand" is með hinni hendinni. An additional element in Icelandic are the interrogative pronouns hvor / hvor / hvort ("who / which / what" of two) and hver / hver / hvert ("who / which / what" of more than two).

=== Baltic languages ===
Among the Baltic languages, the dual form existed but is now nearly obsolete in standard Lithuanian. The dual form Du litu was still used on two-litas coins issued in 1925, but the plural form (2 litai) is used on later two-litas coins.

Singular	Dual	Plural
vyras ("a man")	vyru ("two men")	vyrai ("men")
pirštas ("finger")	pirštu ("two fingers")	pirštai ("fingers")
draugas ("a friend")	draugu ("two friends")	draugai ("friends")
mergina ("a girl")	mergini ("two girls")	merginos ("girls")
einu ("I go")	einava ("We two go")	einame ("We (more than two) go")
eisiu ("I will go")	eisiva ("We two will go")	eisime ("We (more than two) will go")

=== Slavic languages ===
Common Slavic had a complete singular-dual-plural number system, although the nominal dual paradigms showed considerable syncretism, just as they did in Proto-Indo-European. Dual was fully operable at the time of Old Church Slavonic manuscript writings, and it has been subsequently lost in most Slavic dialects in the historical period.

Of the extant Slavic languages, only Slovene and Sorbian have preserved the dual number as a productive form. In all of the remaining languages, its influence is still found in the declension of nouns of which there are commonly only two: eyes, ears, shoulders, in certain fixed expressions, and the agreement of nouns when used with numbers.

In all the languages, the words "two" and "both" preserve characteristics of the dual declension. The following table shows a selection of forms for the numeral "two":

language	nom.-acc.-voc.	gen.	loc.	dat.	instr.
Common Slavic	*dъva (masc.) *dъvě (fem./nt.)	*dъvoju		*dъvěma	
Belarusian	два dva (masc./nt.) дзве dzve (fem.)	двух dvukh (masc./nt.) дзвюх dzvyukh (fem.)		двум dvum (masc./nt.) дзвюм dzvyum (fem.)	двума dvuma (masc./nt.) дзвюма dzvyuma (fem.)
Czech	dva (masc.) dvě (fem./nt.)	dvou		dvěma	
Polish	dwa (masc./nt.) dwie (fem.)^{1}	dwu dwóch		dwu dwóm	dwoma dwiema
Russian	два dva (masc./nt.) две dve (fem.)	двух dvukh		двум dvum	двумя dvumya (usual form) двемя dvemya (seldom used, dialectal; fem. in some dialects)
Serbo-Croatian	два / dva (masc./nt.) две / dvije (fem.)	двају / dvaju (masc./nt.) двеју / dviju (fem.)	двaма / dvama (masc./nt.)^{2} двема / dvjema (fem.)		
Slovak	dva (masc. inanim.) dvaja / dvoch (masc. anim.) dve (fem., nt.)	dvoch		dvom	dvoma / dvomi
Slovene	dva (masc.) dve (fem./nt.)	dveh		dvema	
Sorbian	dwaj (masc.) dwě (fem./nt.)	dweju	dwěmaj		
Ukrainian	два dva (masc./nt.) дві dvi (fem.)	двох dvokh		двом dvom	двома dvoma

Notes:

1. In some Slavic languages, there is a further distinction between animate and inanimate masculine nouns. In Polish, for animate masculine nouns, the possible nominative forms are dwaj, or dwóch.
2. Variant form for the masculine/neuter locative and instrumental in Serbo-Croatian: двојим(а) / dvojim(a).

In Common Slavic, the rules were relatively simple for determining the appropriate case and number form of the noun, when it was used with a numeral. The following rules apply:

1. With the numeral "one", both the noun, adjective, and numeral were in the same singular case, with the numeral being declined as a pronoun.
2. With the numeral "two", both the noun, adjective, and numeral were in the same dual case. There were separate forms for the masculine and neuter-feminine nouns.
3. With the numerals "three" and "four", the noun, adjective, and numeral were in the same plural case.
4. With any numeral above "four", the numeral was followed by the noun and adjective in the genitive plural case. The numeral itself was actually a numeral noun that was declined according to its syntactic function.

With the loss of the dual in most of the Slavic languages, the above pattern now is only seen in the forms of the numbers for the tens, hundreds, and rarely thousands. This can be seen by examining the following table:

Language	10	20	30	50	100	200	300	500
Common Slavic	*desętь	*dъva desęti	*trije desęte	*pętь desętъ	*sъto	*dъvě sъtě	*tri sъta	*pętь sъtъ
Belarusian	дзесяць dzesyats′	дваццаць dvatstsats′	трыццаць tritstsats′	пяцьдзесят pyats′dzesyat	сто sto	дзвесце dzvestse	трыста trista	пяцьсот pyats′sot
Bulgarian	десет deset	двадесет dvadeset	тридесет trideset	петдесет petdeset	сто sto	двеста dvesta	триста trista	петстотин petstotin
Czech	deset	dvacet	třicet	padesát	sto	dvě stě	tři sta	pět set
Macedonian	десет deset	дваесет dvaeset	триесет trieset	педесет pedeset	сто sto	двесте dveste	триста trisa	петстотини petstotini
Polish	dziesięć	dwadzieścia	trzydzieści	pięćdziesiąt	sto	dwieście	trzysta	pięćset
Russian	десять desyat′	двадцать dvadtsat′	тридцать tridtsat′	пятьдесят pyatdesyat	сто sto	двести dvesti	триста trista	пятьсот pyatsot
Serbo-Croatian	десет deset	двадесет dvadeset	тридесет trideset	педесет pedeset	сто sto	дв(ј)еста dv(j)esta	триста trista	петсто petsto
Upper Sorbian	dźesać	dwaceći	třiceći	pjećdźesat	sto	dwě sćě	tři sta	pjeć stow
Slovak	desať	dvadsať	tridsať	päťdesiat	sto	dvesto	tristo	päťsto
Slovene	deset	dvajset	trideset	petdeset	sto	dvesto	tristo	petsto
Ukrainian	десять desyat′	двадцять dvadtsyat′	тридцять trydtsyat′	п'ятдесят p″yatdesyat	сто sto	двісті dvisti	триста trysta	п'ятсот p″yatsot

The Common Slavic rules governing the declension of nouns after numerals, which were described above, have been preserved in Slovene. In those Slavic languages that have lost the dual, the system has been simplified and changed in various ways, but many languages have kept traces of the dual in it. In general, Czech, Slovak, Polish and Ukrainian have extended the pattern of "three/four" to "two"; Russian, Belarusian and Serbo-Croatian have, on the contrary, extended the pattern of "two" to "three/four"; and Bulgarian and Macedonian have extended the pattern of "two" to all numerals. The resulting systems are as follows:

1. In Czech, Slovak, Polish and Ukrainian, numerals from "two" to "four" are always followed by a noun in the same plural case, but higher numerals (if in the nominative) are followed by a noun in the genitive plural.
2. In Belarusian and Serbo-Croatian, numerals from "two" to "four" (if in the nominative) are followed by a noun in a form originating from the Common Slavic nominative dual, which has now completely or almost completely merged with the nominative plural (in the case of Belarusian) or genitive singular (in the case of Serbo-Croatian). Higher numerals are followed by a noun in the genitive plural.
3. In Russian, the form of noun following the numeral is nominative singular if the numeral ends in "one", genitive singular if the numeral ends in "two" to "four", and genitive plural otherwise. As an exception, the form of noun is also genitive plural if the numeral ends in 11 to 14. Also, some words (for example, many measure words, such as units) have a special "count form" (счётная форма) for use in numerical phrases instead of genitive (for some words mandatory, for others optional), for example, восемь мегабайт, пять килограмм and пять килограммов, три ряда́ and три ря́да, and полтора часа́.
4. In Bulgarian and Macedonian, all numerals are followed by a noun in a form originating from the Common Slavic nominative dual, which has now been re-interpreted as a "count form" or "quantitative plural".

These different systems are exemplified in the table below where the word "wolf" is used to form nominative noun phrases with various numerals. The dual and forms originating from it are underlined.

	"wolf"	"wolves"	"two wolves"	"three wolves"	"five wolves"
Noun form	nom. sing.	nom. plur.	varies		
Common Slavic	*vьlkъ	vьlci	dъva vьlka (nom. dual)	tri vьlci (nom. pl.)	pętь vьlkъ (gen. pl.)
Slovene	volk	volkovi	dva volka (nom. dual)	trije volkovi (nom. pl.)	pet volkov (gen. pl.)
Czech	vlk	vlci	dva/tři vlci (nom. pl.)		pět vlků (gen. pl.)
Polish	wilk	wilki wilcy (rare)	dwa/trzy wilki (nom. pl.) dwaj/trzej wilcy (nom. pl.)		pięć wilków (gen. pl.)
Slovak	vlk	vlky (concrete) vlci (abstract)	dva/tri vlky (nom. pl.) dvaja/traja vlci (nom. pl.)		päť vlkov (gen. pl.) piati vlci (nom. pl.)
Ukrainian	вовк vovk	вовки́ vovký	два/три во́вки dva/try vóvky (nom. pl.)		п'ять вовків p″yat′ vovkiv (gen. pl.)
Belarusian	воўк vowk	ваўкі vawki	два/тры ваўкі dva/try vawki (nom. pl.)		пяць ваўкоў pyats′ vawkow (gen. pl.)
Russian	волк volk	волки volki	два/три волкa dva/tri volka (gen. sg.)		пять волков pyat volkov (gen. pl.)
Serbo-Croatian	вук / vuk	вукови / vukovi (concrete) вŷци / vûci (abstract)	два/три вука / dva/tri vuka (gen. sg.)		пет вукова / pet vukova (gen. pl.)
Bulgarian	вълк vǎlk	вълци vǎltsi	два/три/пет вълка dva/tri/pet vălka (count form)		

The dual has also left traces in the declension of nouns describing body parts that humans customarily had two of, for example: eyes, ears, legs, breasts, and hands. Often the plural declension is used to give a figurative meaning. The table below summarizes the key such points.

Language	Examples
Czech	Certain paired body parts (eyes, ears, hands, legs, breasts; but not pair organs e.g. lungs) and their modifying adjectives require in the instrumental and genitive plural cases dual forms: se svýma očima (instrumental dual: "with one's own (two) eyes") or u nohou (genitive dual: "at the (two) feet"). Colloquial Czech will often substitute the dual instrumental for the literary plural instrumental case.
Polish	Oko ("eye") and ucho ("ear") have plural stems deriving from old dual forms, and alternative instrumental and genitive plural forms with archaic dual endings: gen. pl. oczu/ócz/oczów, uszu/uszów; instr. pl. oczami/oczyma, uszami/uszyma. The declension of ręka ("hand, arm") also contains old dual forms (nom./acc./voc. pl ręce, instr. pl. rękami/rękoma, loc. sg./pl. rękach/ręku). The historically dual forms are usually used to refer a person's two hands (dziecko na ręku "child-in-arms"), while the regularized plural forms are used elsewhere. Other archaic dual forms, including dual verbs, can be encountered in older literature and in dialects: Jak nie chceta, to nie musita "If you don't want to, you don't have to".
Slovak	In Slovak, the genitive plural and instrumental plural for the words "eyes" and "ears" has also retained its dual forms when speaking about actual body parts: očiam/očí and ušiam/uší. The regular plural forms are used in metaphorical uses such as "bull eyes" (fried eggs) or the "ears" (handles) of jugs.
Ukrainian	The words "eyes" and "shoulders" had dual forms in the instrumental plural case: очима ochyma ("eyes") and плечима plechyma ("shoulders"). Furthermore, the nominative plural word вуса vusa, which is the dual of вус vus ("whisker"), refers to the moustache, while the true nominative plural word вуси vusy refers to whiskers.
Bulgarian	Some words such as ръка răka "hand" use the originally dual form as a plural (ръце rătse).
Russian	In Russian the word колено koleno ("knee", "tribe (Israelites)") has different plurals: колена kolena ("Israelites") is pure plural and колени koleni (body part) is a dual form. Some cases are different as well: коленами kolenami vs. коленями kolenyami (instr.pl.).

Some scribes of Old Church Slavonic used graphic variants of O when writing forms of "eye", contrasting singular ꙩкꙩ, "eye" with dual ꙭчи or Ꙫчи, "[two] eyes". The difference was graphic, not in pronunciation.

==== Slovene ====
Along with the Sorbian languages, Chakavian, some Kajkavian dialects, and the extinct Old Church Slavonic, Slovene uses the dual. Although popular sources claim that Slovene has "preserved full grammatical use of the dual," Standard Slovene (and, to varying degrees, Slovene dialects) show significant reduction of the dual number system when compared with Common Slavic. In general, dual forms have a tendency to be replaced by plural forms. This tendency is stronger in oblique cases than in the nominative/accusative: in standard Slovene, genitive and locative forms have merged with the plural, and in many dialects, pluralization has extended to dative/instrumental forms. Dual inflection is better preserved in masculine forms than in feminine forms. Natural pairs are usually expressed with the plural in Slovene, not with the dual: e.g. roke "hands", ušesa ears. The dual forms of such nouns can be used, in conjunction with the quantifiers dva "two" or oba "both", to emphasize the number: e.g. Imam samo dve roki "I only have two hands". The words for "parents" and "twins" show variation in colloquial Slovene between plural (starši, dvojčki) and dual (starša, dvojčka). Standard Slovene has replaced the nominative dual pronouns of Common Slavic (vě "the two of us", va "the two of you", ja/ji/ji "the two of them" [m./f./n.]) with new synthetic dual forms: midva/midve (literally, "we-two"), vidva/vidve, onadva/onidve/onidve.

Nominative case of noun volk "wolf", with and without numerals:

without numerals
	nom. sg. (wolf)	nom. dual (2 wolves)	nom. pl. (wolves)
Slovene	volk	volkova	volkovi

with numerals
	wolf	2 wolves	3 (or 4) wolves	5(+) wolves (gen. pl.)
Slovene	en volk	dva volkova	trije volkovi	pet volkov

The dual is recognised by many Slovene speakers as one of the most distinctive features of the language and a mark of recognition, and is often mentioned in tourist brochures.

For verbs, the endings in the present tense are given as -va, -ta, -ta. The table below shows a comparison of the conjugation of the verb delati, which means "to do, to make, to work" and belongs to Class IV in the singular, dual, and plural.

	Singular	Dual	Plural
First person	delam	delava	delamo
Second person	delaš	delata	delate
Third person	dela	delata	delajo

In the imperative, the endings are given as -iva for the first-person dual and -ita for the second-person dual. The table below shows the imperative forms for the verb hoditi ("to walk") in the first and second persons of the imperative (the imperative does not exist for first-person singular).

	Singular	Dual	Plural
First person	—	hodiva	hodimo
Second person	hodi	hodita	hodite

==== Sorbian language ====
As in Slovenian, the Sorbian language (both dialects Upper and Lower Sorbian) has preserved the dual. For nouns, the following endings are used:

	Masculine	Feminine or neuter
Nominative, accusative, vocative	-aj/-ej	-e^{2}/-y/-i
Genitive^{1}	-ow	-ow
Dative, instrumental, locative	-omaj	-omaj

1. The genitive form is based on the plural form of the noun.
2. The -e ending causes various softening changes to occur to the preceding constant, for further information see the article on Sorbian.

For example, the declension of sin (masculine) and crow (feminine) in the dual in Upper Sorbian would be given as

	hrěch ("sin")	wróna ("crow")
Nominative, accusative, vocative	hrěchaj	wrónje
Genitive	hrěchow	wrónow
Dative, instrumental, locative	hrěchomaj	wrónomaj

For verbs, the endings in the present tense are given as -moj, -tej/-taj, -tej/-taj. The table below shows a comparison of the conjugation of the verb pisać, which means "to write" and belongs to Class I in the singular, dual, and plural.

	Singular	Dual	Plural
First person	pisam	pisamoj	pisamy
Second person	pisaš	pisatej	pisaće
Third person	pisa	pisatej	pisaja

== Languages with dual number ==
- Afroasiatic languages
  - Egyptian (including Coptic)
  - Semitic languages
    - Akkadian (Assyrian and Babylonian)
    - Biblical Hebrew
    - Classical Arabic
      - Gulf Arabic (in nouns)
      - Levantine Arabic
      - Maltese
    - Sabaean
    - Ugaritic
  - Chadic languages
    - Hdi
- Austronesian languages
  - Tagalog language
  - Cebuano language
  - Ilocano language
  - Polynesian languages
    - Māori (only the personal pronouns)
    - Samoan (only the personal pronouns)
    - Tongan (only the personal pronouns)
    - Tahitian (only the personal pronouns)
    - Hawaiian (only the personal pronouns)
  - Chamorro (reflected in the verb)
- Indo-European languages
  - Avestan
  - Ancient Greek
  - Germanic languages (only first and second person pronouns and verb forms)
    - North Frisian (only pronouns in some dialects)
    - Gothic
    - Old Frisian (only the personal pronouns)
    - Old English (only the personal pronouns)
    - Old Norse (only the personal pronouns)
      - Icelandic (only the personal pronouns)
    - Old Saxon (only the personal pronouns)
  - Insular Celtic languages:
    - Old Irish
    - Irish (only nouns, only following the numeral for two)
    - Scottish Gaelic (only nouns, only following the numeral for two)
    - Breton language (not mandatory, only for a small number of nouns)
  - Old Church Slavonic
  - Old East Slavic
  - Indo-Aryan languages
    - Sanskrit
    - Punjabi (unrelated to the Sanskrit dual; primarily used for nouns of paired body parts; concurrent with the instrumental case)
  - Slovene
  - Chakavian
  - Sorbian languages:
    - Lower Sorbian
    - Upper Sorbian
- Pama–Nyungan languages
  - Woiwurrung–Taungurung language
  - Yidiny
  - Barngarla
- Uralic languages
  - Khanty
  - Mansi
  - Nenets
  - Sami languages
- Other natural languages
  - Alutor
  - Dogrib (only in the first person)
  - Hopi (nouns)
  - Hmong
  - Inuktitut
  - Khamti
  - Khoe languages
  - Komo language
  - Koryak
  - Kunama language
  - Lakota (only the personal pronouns, always means "you and I")
  - Mapuzungun
  - Melanesian Pidgin (several related languages)
  - Mi'kmaq
  - Nhanda
  - Santali (nouns)
  - Most Sign languages
  - Tonkawa
  - Xavante language
  - Yaghan
- Constructed languages
  - Quenya (elvish language created by J.R.R Tolkien)
  - Adûnaic (human language created by J.R.R Tolkien)

== See also ==
- Grammatical number
