= Pushkinsky (rural locality) =

Pushkinsky (Russian: Пу́шкинский; masculine), Pushkinskaya (Пу́шкинская; feminine), or Pushkinskoye (Пу́шкинское; neuter) is the name of several rural localities in Russia:

- Pushkinsky, Republic of Bashkortostan, a khutor in Bishkainsky Selsoviet of Aurgazinsky District of the Republic of Bashkortostan
- Pushkinsky, Irkutsk Oblast, an area in Nizhneudinsky District of Irkutsk Oblast
- Pushkinsky, Orenburg Oblast, a settlement in Pushkinsky Selsoviet of Krasnogvardeysky District of Orenburg Oblast
- Pushkinskoye, Republic of Bashkortostan, a village in Kaltymanovsky Selsoviet of Iglinsky District of the Republic of Bashkortostan
- Pushkinskoye, Kaliningrad Oblast, a settlement in Khrabrovsky Rural Okrug of Guryevsky District of Kaliningrad Oblast
- Pushkinskoye, Republic of Kalmykia, a selo in Pushkinskaya Rural Administration of Gorodovikovsky District of the Republic of Kalmykia
- Pushkinskoye, Krasnodar Krai, a selo in Gulkevichsky District of Krasnodar Krai
