= Pushkinsky District =

Location of Moscow Oblast in Russia

Location of Saint Petersburg in Russia

Pushkinsky District (Russian: Пу́шкинский райо́н) is the name of several administrative and municipal districts in Russia:

- Pushkinsky District, Moscow Oblast, an administrative and municipal district of Moscow Oblast
- Pushkinsky District, Saint Petersburg, an administrative city district of the federal city of Saint Petersburg

== See also ==
- Pushkinsky (disambiguation)
