= Pushkinskoye, Republic of Bashkortostan =

Pushkinskoye Пушкинское
- Village
- Location within Bashkortostan Location within Russia
- Coordinates: 54°41′N 56°31′E
- Country: Russia
- Region: Bashkortostan
- District: Iglinsky District
- Time zone: UTC+5:00

Pushkinskoye (Russian: Пушкинское) is a rural locality (a village) in Kaltymanovsky Selsoviet, Iglinsky District, Bashkortostan, Russia. The population was 202 as of 2010. There are 4 streets.

== Geography ==
Pushkinskoye is located 24 km southeast of Iglino (the district's administrative centre) by road. Kalininskoye is the nearest rural locality.
