= Pushkinsky =

Pushkinsky (masculine), Pushkinskaya (feminine), or Pushkinskoye (neuter) may refer to:

- Pushkinsky District, name of several districts in Russia
- Pushkinsky (rural locality) (Pushkinskaya, Pushkinskoye), name of several rural localities in Russia
- Pushkinsky Bridge, name of one demolished and three existing bridges across the Moskva River, Russia; see Andreyevsky Bridge
- Pushkinskaya (Moscow Metro), a station of the Moscow Metro, Russia
- Pushkinskaya (Saint Petersburg Metro), a station of the Saint Petersburg Metro, Russia
- Pushkinskaya (Minsk Metro), a station of the Minsk Metro, Belarus
- Pushkinskaya Square, a square in Moscow, Russia
