= Pushkin House (disambiguation) =

Pushkin House is the common name for the Institute of Russian Literature in St. Petersburg. Pushkin House may also refer to:

- Pushkin House, London, a Russian cultural centre, London
- Pushkin House (novel), Andrei Bitov's novel
