= Pushkin Park =

Park in Saransk, Russia

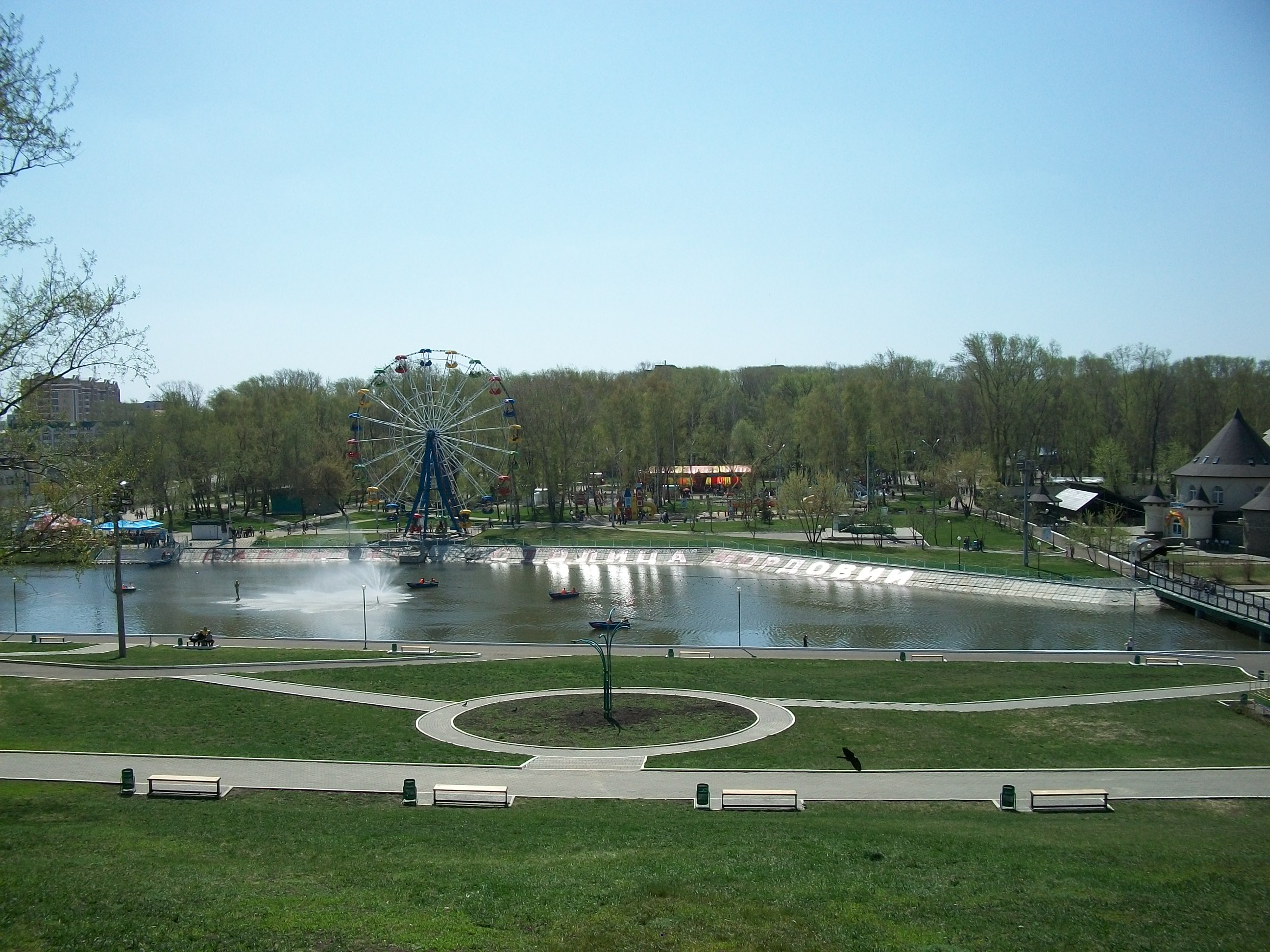
Pushkin Park

Pushkin Park is located in the centre of Saransk in Mordovia, Russia. Pushkin Park is one of the most beautiful parks in Saransk; its area is about 40 hectares.

== History ==
In 1864, a small landscaped area called the place of Uspensky Boulevard with a few lime avenues and flower beds in the center was surrounded by fences and lilac bushes. This city park was named after the great Russian poet Alexander Pushkin.

In the early 20th century, due to the efforts of the Fine Arts Society, the Park was redeveloped and in 1914 the park was open again and became the center of urban culture. There were important social events such as Graduation Day. In a festive atmosphere, with large crowds, the graduates were awarded certificates of completion of educational institutions. Then began a great cultural program, made by young people.

In 1935, Pushkin Park underwent great changes. The park expanded its area to 10 hectares. Pushkin Park remains an area of recreation in the heart of Saransk.

== Modern Pushkin Park ==
Pushkin Park is one of the best parks in Russia. This park became a place of rest for people of different ages, interests and the main place to hold large events. Its shady avenues, clean air and good atmosphere attract visitors on weekends and week days.

There are three main parts in this park: a rest zone, an attractions zone and an event zone. Pushkin Park has three main attractions. There are a big wheel, a brass band that plays every Sunday, and a train for little children and their parents.
