= Alexander Pushkin (play) =

1925 Russian play by Mikhail Bulgakov

Alexander Pushkin (The Last Days)
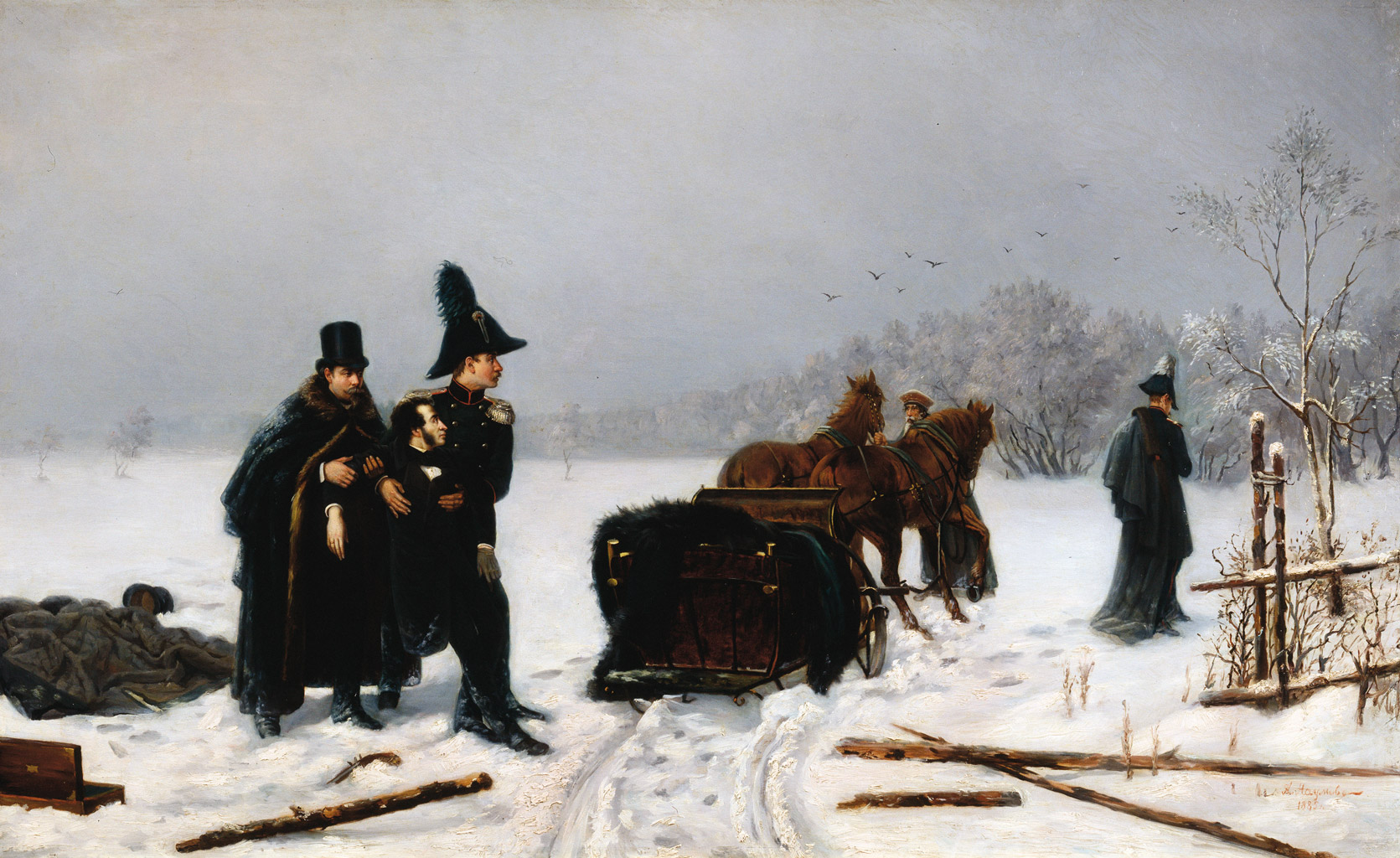
- Pushkin's duel with d'Anthes by A. Naumov, 1884
- Written by: Mikhail Bulgakov
- Original language: Russian
- Subject: Alexander Pushkin
- Genre: Historical drama

Premiere
- Date premiered: 10 April 1943

Alexander Pushkin (Russian: Александр Пушкин), also called The Last Days (Russian: Последние дни) is a four-act play by Mikhail Bulgakov. Written in 1934–1935, it depicts the last days of Alexander Pushkin's life. The play was set to be published in 1937, on the 100th anniversary of Pushkin's death; however, it was not published during Bulgakov's lifetime.

== Plot ==
Although the character of Alexander Pushkin does not appear on stage, the story follows the circumstances surrounding his death, particularly the relationship between Natalia Pushkina and her lover Georges-Charles de Heeckeren d'Anthès. In the play, Pushkin falls victim to a conspiracy of the authorities, who felt that the poet was hostile to them. Secular society itself, personified by Stroganov, Saltykov, Dolgorukov and others, including the envious poets Vladimir Benediktov and Nestor Kukolnik, plays a subordinate role in the play.

== History ==
Bulgakov began working on the play on 25 August 1934. Bulgakov approached writer Vikenty Veresaev for help with Pushkin's biographical material, however Veresaev objected to the play's premise as it did not have the character of Pushkin appear on stage. Nevertheless, both of the authors signed a contract for the play with the Vakhtangov Theater. There were also talks with Sergei Prokofiev about turning the drama into an opera. In addition, contracts were signed with the Moscow Art Theater, the Leningrad Red Theater, the Saratov Drama Theater, the Gorky Drama Theater, the Tatar State Academic Theater, the Kiev Theater of the Red Army, the Kharkov Theater of the Revolution, and the Kharkov Theater of Russian Drama. Bulgakov followed the cliches of contemporary Pushkin studies for depicting historical characters such as Nicholas I of Russia. Another aspect of the play is the confrontation between the artist-creator and despotic power. On 27 March 1934, Bulgakov completed the play's first draft, and finished its final text on 9 September 1935. Some of the text alluding to the murder of politically unreliable people was removed from the final text.

Despite successful readings, Veresaev asked for his name to be removed from the title page. In September 1935, it was handed over to the Vakhtangov Theater and permitted for production. However, after Bulgakov's The Cabal of Hypocrites was removed from the theater by the main repertoire committee, Alexander Pushkin was suspended.

In May 1939, a new contract was signed between Bulgakov, Veresaev, and the Moscow Art Theater. However, it was only first premiered on 10 April 1943.

== See also ==
- Bolshoi Theatre
- Russian literature
